The following is a sports team nicknames for colleges (universities in non-U.S. English) in North America, primarily in the United States and Canada.

These are the general, collective nicknames that various colleges and universities' athletic teams compete under, grouped by a general theme before dividing into specific nicknames. For specific names of live or costumed mascots, see List of U.S. college mascots.

Animals

Austin CC (Austin, TX) - Riverbats
Bard Simon's Rock (Great Barrington, MA) - Llamas
Pittsburg State (Pittsburg, KS) - Gorillas
Richmond (Richmond, VA) - Spiders
SD State (Brookings) - Jackrabbits
Tufts (Medford, MA & Somerville, MA) - Jumbos
UC Irvine (Irvine) - Anteaters
UC Santa Cruz (Santa Cruz) - Banana Slugs
WA Tech (Bellevue) - Red Pandas
Yakima Valley CC (Yakima, WA) - Yaks

Aardvarks

Aims CC (Greeley, CO)
Pikes Peak State College (Colorado Springs)

Amphibians/Reptiles (larger category)

Eastern AZ (Thatcher) – Gila Monsters
FL Keys (Key West) - Tugas
Hostos CC (The Bronx) – Caimans
Maryland (College Park) – Terrapins
Nayarit (Tepic) - Reptiles
Spoon River (Canton, IL) – Snappers
Truckee Meadows CC (Reno, NV) - Lizards

Frogs
North Seattle (Seattle, WA) - Tree Frogs
Quinebaug Valley CC (Danielson, CT)
TCU (Fort Worth, TX) – Horned Frogs

Gators

Allegheny (Meadville, PA)
Brazosport (Lake Jackson, TX)
Eastern Gateway CC (Steubenville, OH & Youngstown, OH)
Florida (Gainesville)
Green River (Auburn, WA)
Horry-Georgetown Tech (Conway, SC)
Houston-Downtown (Houston)
Notre Dame (MD) (Baltimore, MD)
Russell Sage (Albany, NY & Troy, NY)
San Francisco State (San Francisco)
Thomas Nelson CC (Hampton, VA & Williamsburg, VA)

Geckos

GateWay CC (Phoenix, AZ)
San Jacinto (Pasadena, TX & Houston)

Antelopes

Gillette (Gillette, WY) - Pronghorns
Grand Canyon (Phoenix, AZ) – Lopes
Lamar CC (Lamar, CO) – Runnin' Lopes
Nebraska-Kearney (Kearney, NE) - Lopers
ULethbridge (Lethbridge, AB) - Pronghorns

Armadillos

Randolph CC (Randolph County, NC)
San Antonio (San Antonio)

Badgers

Amarillo (Amarillo, TX)
Brock (St. Catherines, ON)
Northern VT-Johnson (Johnson)
Spring Hill (Mobile, AL)
Wisconsin (Madison)
Snow (Ephraim, UT)

Bearcats

Baruch (Manhattan)
Binghamton (Vestal, NY)
Brescia (Owensboro, KY)
Cincinnati (Cincinnati)
Columbia Bible (Abbotsford, BC)
Lander (Greenwood, SC)
McKendree (Lebanon, IL)
Northwest Missouri State (Maryville)
Rust (Holly Springs, MS)
Saint Vincent (Latrobe, PA)
Sam Houston (Huntsville, TX) – Bearkats
Southwest Baptist (Bolivar, MO)
Willamette (Salem, OR)

Bears (larger category)

Athens State, (Athens, AL)
Barclay (Haviland, KS)
Barnard (New York City)
Baton Rouge CC (Baton Rouge)
Baylor (Waco, TX)
Bevill State CC (Sumiton, AL)
Bloomfield (Bloomfield, NJ)
Blue Ridge CC (Flat Rock, NC & Brevard, NC)
Bridgewater State (Bridgewater, MA)
Brookhaven (Farmers Branch, TX)
Brown (Providence, RI)
Central Arkansas (Conway) – Bears and Sugar Bears
Columbia (BC) (Vancouver)
Des Moines Area CC (multicampus)
Golden State Baptist (Santa Clara, CA)
Harcum (Bryn Mawr, PA)
Lenoir–Rhyne (Hickory, NC)
Livingstone (Salisbury, NC)
L.A. City (East Hollywood, Los Angeles, CA) - Cubs
Mercer (Macon, GA)
MO State (Springfield, MO)
Morgan State (Baltimore, MD)
Mott CC (Flint, MI)
Northern CO (Greeley, CO)
NE State CC (Blountville, TN)
NYIT (Old Westbury, NY)
Phoenix (Phoenix, AZ)
Pikeville (Pikeville, KY)
Quest (Squamish, BC) - Kermode Bears
Rocky Mountain (Billings, MT)
Saint Joseph's (NY) (Brooklyn &Patchogue, NY))
Santa Rosa Junior (Santa Rosa, CA) - Bear Cubs
Shaw (Raleigh, NC)
Shawnee State (Portsmouth, OH)
SUNY Potsdam (Potsdam, NY)
SW MS CC (Summit, MS)
Truett McConnell (Cleveland, GA)
UAlberta (Edmonton) – Pandas
UC San Francisco (San Francisco)
USCGA (New London, CT)
Ursinus (Collegeville, PA)
Washington University in St. Louis (St. Louis)

Black Bears

Maine (Orono, ME)
PA Highlands CC (Johnstown, PA)

Bruins

Bellevue (NE) (Bellevue, NE)
Belmont (Nashville, TN)
Bob Jones (Greenville, SC)
Carolina (Winston-Salem)
George Fox (Newberg, OR)
Kellogg CC (Battle Creek, MI)
Salt Lake CC (Salt Lake City)
Sheridan (ON) (multicampus)
Trocaire (Buffalo, NY)
UCLA (Los Angeles)

Golden Bears

California (Berkeley)
Clinton (SC) (Rock Hill, SC)
Concordia University (MN) (Saint Paul, MN)
Kutztown (Kutztown, PA)
Miles (Fairfield, AL)
UAlberta (Edmonton) (men's teams only)
Western New England (Springfield, MA)
WVU Tech (Beckley, WV)

Grizzlies

Adams State (Alamosa, CO)
Butler CC (El Dorado, KS)
Franklin (IN) (Franklin, IN)
Georgia Gwinnett (Lawrenceville, GA)
Georgian (Barrie, ON)
Guttman CC (Manhattan) (no sports teams)
Missouri State-West Plains (West Plains, MO)
Montana (Missoula)
Oakland (Rochester Hills, MI) - Golden Grizzlies

Kodiaks

Cascadia (Bothell, WA)
Lethbridge (Lethbridge, AB)

Polar Bears

Bowdoin (Brunswick, ME)
OH Northern (Ada, OH)

Big Cats (larger category excluding Lions and Tigers)
Vanier (Montreal) - Cheetahs

Bobcats

Bates (Lewiston, ME)
Brandon (Brandon, MB)
Bryant and Stratton (Syracuse, NY and Buffalo, NY)
Burman (Lacombe, AB)
Central OR CC (Bend, OR)
East GA State (Swainsboro, GA)
Frostburg State (Frostburg, MD)
Georgia College (Milledgeville, GA)
GA NW Tech (multicampus)
Haywood CC (Clyde, NC)
Jones County Junior (Ellisville, MS)
Lees-McRae (Banner Elk, NC)
Montana State (Bozeman, MT)
Ohio (Athens, OH)
Ozarks (Point Lookout, MO)
Paul Smith's (Paul Smiths, New York)
Peru State (Peru, NE)
Quinnipiac (Hamden, CT)
St. Thomas (FL) (Miami)
Texas State (San Marcos, TX)
UC Merced (Merced, CA)
Pitt–Greensburg (Greensburg, PA)
WV Wesleyan (Buckhannon, WV)

Catamounts

Vermont (Burlington, VT)
Western Carolina (Cullowhee, NC)
Potomac State (Keyser, WV)

Cougars

Alameda (Alameda, CA)
Assiniboine CC (Brandon, MB)
Augusta Tech (Augusta, GA)
Averett (Danville, VA)
Azusa Pacific (Azusa, CA)
Barton CC (Great Bend, KS)
Brigham Young (Provo, UT)
Caldwell (Caldwell, NJ)
Cal State San Marcos (San Marcos, CA)
Camden County (Blackwood, NJ)
Central Carolina CC (multicampus)
Canyons (Santa Clarita, CA)
Charleston (Charleston, SC)
Chatham (Pittsburgh)
Chicago State (Chicago)
Clackamas CC (Oregon City, OR)
Clark (MA) (Worcester, MA)
Cleveland State CC (Cleveland, TN)
Clinton CC (NY) (Plattsburgh, NY)
Coastal Bend (Beeville, TX)
Coastal Carolina CC (Jacksonville, NC)
Collin (McKinney, TX)
CO Christian (Lakewood, CO)
Columbia (MO) (Columbia, MO)
Columbus State CC (Columbus, OH)
Columbus State (Columbus, GA)
Concordia Chicago (River Forest, IL)
Cuesta (San Luis Obispo, CA)
Frederick CC (Frederick, MD)
Genesee CC (Genesee, New York)
Highland CC (Freeport, IL)
Holyoke CC (Holyoke, MA)
Houston (Houston)
IL Central (East Peoria)
IU Kokomo (Kokomo, IN)
Kalamazoo Valley CC (Kalamazoo, MI)
Kean (Union, NJ)
Kishwaukee (Malta, IL) – Kougars
Kuyper (Grand Rapids)
Lassen CC (Susanville, CA)
L.A. Southwest (Los Angeles, CA)
Lawson State CC (Birmingham, AL)
Lehigh Carbon CC (Schnecksville, PA)
Manchester CC (CT) (Manchester, CT)
Medgar Evers (Brooklyn)
Minnesota–Morris (Morris, MN)
Misericordia (Dallas, PA)
Mount Royal (Calgary)
Mount Vernon Nazarene (Mount Vernon, OH)
Pitt-Johnstown (Johnstown, PA) – Mountain Cats
Redlands CC (El Reno, OK)
Regina (Regina, SK) (all sports except football)
Saint Francis (IN) (Fort Wayne, IN)
Sioux Falls (Sioux Falls, SD)
Saint Xavier (Chicago)
Sault (Sault Ste. Marie, ON)
South Mountain CC (Phoenix, AZ)
Southern IL–Edwardsville (Edwardsville, IL)
Spring Arbor (Spring Arbor, MI)
St. Charles CC (Cottleville, MO)
Taft (Taft, CA)
UW–Waukesha (Waukesha, WI)
Washington State (Pullman, WA)
Western NE CC (Scottsbluff, NE)
Wilkes CC (Wilkesboro, NC)

Jaguars

Augusta (Augusta, GA)
Danville Area CC (Danville, IL)
Governors State (University Park, IL)
Houston-Victoria (Victoria, TX)
IUPUI (Indianapolis)
Johnson (PA) (Scranton, PA)
Johnston CC (Smithfield, NC)
Nashua CC (Nashua, NH)
Noreste (Tampico)
Regiomontana (Monterrey) 
San Jose City (San Jose, CA)
South Alabama (Mobile)
Southern (Baton Rouge)
Southwestern (CA) (Chula Vista, CA)
Spelman (Atlanta)
TX A&M-San Antonio (San Antonio)
Williamson (Franklin, TN)

Leopards

Lafayette (Easton, PA)
Logan (MO) (Chesterfield, MO)
La Verne (La Verne, CA)
Temple (TX) (Temple, TX)
Wentworth Tech (Boston)

Lynx

Carroll CC (Westminster, MD)
Colorado-Denver (Denver) (no sports teams)
Édouard-Montpetit (Longueuil, QC)
Kennebec Valley CC (Fairfield, ME)
Lesley (Cambridge, MA)
Occidente (Los Mochis)
NHTI Concord CC (Concord, NH)
Rhodes (Memphis, TN)
Valle de México (Mexico City)

Mountain Lions

Alliant International (multicampus)
Concord (Athens, WV)
De Anza (Cupertino, CA)
Estrella Mountain CC (Avondale, AZ)
Mayland CC (Spruce Pine, NC)
Mount Wachusett CC (Gardner, MA)
UCCS (Colorado Springs, CO)
Young Harris (Young Harris, GA)

Panthers

Adelphi (Hempstead, NY)
Albany Pharmacy/Health (Albany, NY)
Baltimore City CC (Baltimore)
Birmingham–Southern (Birmingham, AL)
Canadore (North Bay, ON)
Chaffey (Rancho Cucamonga, CA)
Chapman (Orange, CA)
Chihuahua Tech (Chihuahua, Mexico) - Panteras
Clark Atlanta (Atlanta)
Claflin (Orangeburg, SC)
Davenport (Grand Rapids, MI)
Denmark Tech (Denmark, SC)
Drury (Springfield, MO)
Eastern IL (Charleston, IL)
Ellsworth (Iowa Falls, IA)
Ferrum (Ferrum, VA)
FIU (University Park, FL)
Florida Tech (Melbourne, FL)
Georgia State (Atlanta)
Greenville (Greenville, IL)
Hanover (Hanover, IN)
Hartnell (Salinas, CA)
High Point (High Point, NC)
KY Wesleyan (Owensboro, KY)
LaGrange (LaGrange, GA)
Manhattan CC (Manhattan, NYC, NY)
Mérici (Quebec City) - Panthéres
Middlebury (Middlebury, VT)
Metropolitan Autonomous (Mexico City) - Black Panthers
Morton (Cicero, IL)
Neosho County CC (Chanute, KS)
Northern IA (Cedar Falls, IA)
OH Dominican (Columbus, OH)
Olive-Harvey (Chicago)
Passaic County CC (Paterson, NJ)
Palm Beach State (Palm Beach, FL)
Pellissippi State CC (Hardin Valley, Tennessee)
Philander Smith (Little Rock, AR)
Piedmont VA CC (Charlottesville, VA)
Pillar (Newark, NJ)
Pitt (Pittsburgh)
Pitt-Bradford (Bradford, PA)
Plymouth State (Plymouth, NH)
Portland CC (Portland, OR)
Prairie View A&M (Prairie View, TX)
Prince Edward Island (Charlottetown, PEI)
Principia (Elsah, IL)
Pueblo CC (eSports only) (Pueblo, CO)
Richmond CC (Hamlet, NC)
Sacramento City (Sacramento, CA)
SUNY Old Westbury (Old Westbury, NY)
SUNY Purchase (Purchase, NY)
South FL State (Avon Park, FL)
Tompkins Cortland CC (Dryden, New York)
UW-Milwaukee (Milwaukee)
VA Union (Richmond, VA)
York (NE) (York, NE)

Pumas

Arapahoe CC (no teams) (multicampus)
National Autonomous Mexico (Mexico City, Mexico)
Paradise Valley CC (Phoenix, AZ)

Wildcats

Abilene Christian (Abilene, TX)
Arizona (Tucson, AZ)
Baker (Baldwin City, KS)
Bay Path (Longmeadow, MA)
Bethel (TN) (McKenzie, TN)
Bethune-Cookman (Daytona, FL)
Bishop State CC (Mobile, AL)
Cazenovia (Cazenovia, NY)
CC Allegheny County (Allegheny County, PA)
Chico State (Chico, CA)
Central WA (Ellensburg, WA)
Culver–Stockton (Canton, MO)
Davidson (Davidson, NC)
Daemen (Amherst, NY)
Emmanuel (ON) (Kitchener, ON)
Fort Valley State (Fort Valley, GA)
IN Wesleyan (Marion, IN)
Johnson & Wales (multicampus)
Kansas State (Manhattan, KS)
Kentucky (Lexington)
LA Christian (Pineville, LA)
Linfield (McMinnville, OR)
New Hampshire (Durham, NH)
ND Science (Wahpeton, ND)
NW Vista (San Antonio)
Northern Michigan (Marquette, MI)
Northwestern (Evanston, IL/Chicago)
Orangeburg-Calhoun Tech (Orangeburg, SC)
PA Tech (Williamsport, PA)
Pearl River CC (Poplarville, MS)
Portland Bible (Portland, OR)
Randolph (Lynchburg, VA) – WildCats
St. Catherine (St. Paul/Minneapolis)
SUNY Poly (Utica, NY)
Villanova (Villanova, PA)
Wayne County CC (multicampus)
Wayne State (NE) (Wayne, NE)
Weber State (Ogden, UT)
West L.A. (Culver City, CA)
Western NV (Carson City, NV)
Wiley (Marshall, TX)
Wilmington (DE) (New Castle, DE)
UW–Washington County (West Bend, WI)

Birds (larger category, excluding Eagles and Hawks)

Antonio Narro Agrarian (Saltillo, Mexico)-  Vultures
Aguascalientes (Aguascalientes)
Chattanooga (Chattanooga, TN) – Mocs
Colima (Colima City) - Parrots
Delaware (Newark, DE) – Blue Hens
Everglades (multicampus) - Egrets
Fresno Pacific (Fresno, CA) – Sunbirds
Hesston (Hesston, KS) - Larks
Intercontinental (Mexico City) - Wild Swans
Jackson State CC (TN) (Jackson, TN) - Green Jays
Oglethorpe (Atlanta) – Stormy Petrels
Pomona-Pitzer (joint team) – Sagehens
Puerto Rico-Río Piedras (San Juan, Puerto Rico) - Gallitos & Jerezanas
Quintana Roo (Chetumal) - Toucans
SUNY Empire (Saratoga Springs, NY) - Bluebirds
Treasure Valley CC (Ontario, OR) - Chukars
United Tribes Tech (Bismarck, ND) - T-Birds
WV Northern CC (Wheeling, WV) - Thundering Chickens

Bantams

Trinity (CT) (Hartford, CT)
South Carolina-Union

Blue Jays

Elizabethtown (Elizabethtown, PA)
Johns Hopkins (Baltimore)
Manor (Jenkintown, PA)
MN West CC/Tech (multicampus)
Saint Joseph (CT) (West Hartford, CT)
Westminster (MO) (Fulton, MO)

Bluejays

Creighton (Omaha, NE)
Elmhurst (Elmhurst, IL)
Tabor (Hillsboro, KS)

Cardinals

Andrews (Berrien Springs, MI)
Ball State (Muncie, IN)
Catholic (Washington, D.C.)
Concordia (MI) (Ann Arbor, MI)
Gadsden State CC (Gadsden, AL)
Hibbing CC (Hibbing, MN)
IL State (Normal, IL) (Redbirds)
Incarnate Word (San Antonio)
Labette CC (Parsons, KS)
Lamar (Beaumont, TX)
Louisville (Louisville, KY)
MA Pharmacy/Health (Boston)
McGill (Montreal) - Redbirds
Mineral Area (Park Hills, MO)
North Central (IL) (Naperville, IL)
North ID (Coeur D'Alene, ID)
Otterbein (Westerville, OH)
Saginaw Valley State (University Center, MI)
Saint Mary's (MN) (Winona, MN)
Skagit Valley (Mount Vernon, WA)
St. John Fisher (Rochester, NY)
Stratford (multicampus)
SUNY Plattsburgh (Plattsburgh, NY)
Trinity Valley CC (Athens, TX)
Wesleyan (CT) (Middletown, CT)
Wheeling (Wheeling, WV)
William Jewell (Liberty, Missouri)
CUNY York (Jamaica, Queens)

Chaparrals

DuPage (Glen Ellyn, IL)
El Centro (Dallas)
Lubbock Christian (Lubbock, TX)
Midland (TX) (Midland, TX)

Condors

Conestoga (Kitchener, ON)
Oxnard (Oxnard, CA)

Ducks

Century (White Bear Lake, MN) – Wood Ducks
Mainland (Texas City, TX) - Fighting Ducks
Oregon (Eugene, OR)
Richland (Dallas) – Thunderducks
SUNY Schenectady (Schenectady, NY)
Stevens (Hoboken, NJ)

Falcons

Air Force (Colorado Springs, CO)
Albertus Magnus (New Haven, CT)
Bentley (Waltham, MA)
Berkshire CC (Pittsfield, MA)
Bowling Green (Bowling Green, OH)
Cedar Crest (Allentown, PA)
Cerritos (Norwalk, CA)
Concordia WI (Mequon, WI)
Davis (NY) (Johnson City, NY)
Daytona State (Daytona Beach, FL)
Dutchess CC (Poughkeepsie, NY)
East Central (MO) (Union, MO)
Eastern ID (Idaho Falls, ID)
Fairmont State (Fairmont, WV)
Fanshawe (London, ON)
Felician (Lodi, NJ & Rutherford, NJ)
Fisher (Boston)
Fitchburg State (Fitchburg, MA)
FL College (Temple Terrace, FL)
Folsom Lake (Folsom, CA)
Friends (Wichita, KS)
KS Christian (Overland Park, KS)
Lackawanna (Scranton, PA)
Langara (Vancouver, BC)
Lone Star-CyFair (Cypress, TX)
Messiah (Grantham, PA)
Montevallo (Montevallo, AL)
Northern ME CC (Presque Isle, ME)
Notre Dame (OH) (South Euclid, OH)
Pfeiffer (Misenheimer, NC)
St. Augustine's (Raleigh, NC)
Seattle Pacific (Seattle)
SE IL (Harrisburg, IL)
Simmons (KY) (Louisville)
Solano CC (Fairfield, CA)
Truman (IL) (Chicago)
UT Permian Basin (Odessa, TX)
UW-Fond du Lac (Fond du Lac, WI)
UW-River Falls (River Falls, WI)
Veracruzana (Veracruz) 
West Hills Coalinga (Coalinga, CA)

Gamecocks

Jacksonville State (Jacksonville, AL)
South Carolina (Columbia, SC)

Gulls

Endicott (Beverly, MA)
Rappahannock CC (Glenns, Virginia & Warsaw, VA)
Salisbury (Salisbury, MD) – Seagulls

Herons

Estado de Hidalgo (Pachuca) - Silver Herons
Great Bay CC (Portsmouth, NH)
Tlaxcala (Tlaxcala City)
William Smith (Geneva, NY)

Ospreys

North Florida (Jacksonville)
Rogue CC (multicampus)
Stockton (Galloway, NJ)

Owls

Athens Tech (Athens, GA)
Autónoma Guadalajara (Guadalajara)
Bryn Mawr (Bryn Mawr, PA)
Citrus (Glendora, CA)
FL Atlantic (Boca Raton, FL)
Foothill (Los Altos Hills, CA)
Harford CC (Bel Air, MD) - Fighting Owls
Hawai'i-West O'ahu (Kapolei, HI)
Keene State (Keene, NH)
Kennesaw State (Kennesaw, GA)
Kenyon (Gambier, OH)
Maine-Presque Isle (Presque Isle, ME)
Middlesex CC (Lowell, MA & Bedford, MA)
Nash CC (Rocky Mount, NC)
Northern AB Tech (Edmonton, AB) - Ooks
Oconee Fall Line Tech (Sandersville, GA & Dublin, GA)
OR Tech (Klamath Falls, OR) - Hustlin' Owls
Otis Art/Design (Westchester, Los Angeles, California)
Prince George's CC (Largo, MD)
Puerto Rico-Humacao (Humacao, Puerto Rico) - Búhos and Búhas
Rice (Houston, TX)
Southern Connecticut (New Haven, CT)
Temple (Philadelphia)
Union County (Union County, NJ)
Warren Wilson (Asheville, NC)
Westfield State (Westfield, MA)
William Woods (Fulton, MO)

Peacocks

Creative Studies (MI) (Detroit)
Saint Peter's (Jersey City, NJ) - Peacocks & Peahens
Upper IA (Fayette, IA)

Pelicans

John Paul the Great (Escondido, CA)
Nunez CC (Chalmette, LA)

Penguins

Clark (WA) (Vancouver, WA)
Dominican (CA) (San Rafael, CA)
Youngstown State (Youngstown, OH)

Raptors

Bard (Annandale-on-Hudson, New York)
Montgomery (Montgomery County, MD)
Rutgers–Camden (Camden, NJ) - Scarlet Raptors

Ravens

Anderson (Anderson, IN)
Benedictine (KS) (Atchison, KS)
Carleton (ON) (Ottawa, ON)
Coffeyville CC (Coffeyville, KS) – Red Ravens
Franklin Pierce (Rindge, NH)
Reading Area CC (Reading, PA)
Rosemont (Rosemont, PA)

Roadrunners

Angelina (Lufkin, TX)
Butte (Oroville, CA)
Cal State Bakersfield (Bakersfield, CA)
Crafton Hills (Yucaipa, CA)
Dalton State (Dalton, GA)
Desert (Palm Desert, CA)
DE Tech CC-Georgetown (Georgetown, DE)
Intercultural Sinaloa (Municipality of El Fuerte) - Chureas
Linn-Benton CC (Albany, OR)
Metro State (Denver)
Morgan CC (Fort Morgan, CO)
Northcentral (multicampus) (no athletics)
Ramapo (Mahwah, NJ)
Rio Hondo (Whittier, CA)
Rowan-Gloucester (Sewell, NJ)
SW MI (Dowagiac, MI)
State Fair CC (Sedalia, MO)
Tamaulipas (Ciudad Victoria) - Correcaminos
UTSA (San Antonio, TX)
UW–Richland (Richland, WI)

Bison

Bethany (WV) (Bethany, WV)
Bucknell (Lewisburg, PA)
Gallaudet (Washington, D.C.)
Harding (Searcy, AR)
Howard (Washington, D.C.) 
Lipscomb (Nashville, TN)
Manitoba (Winnipeg)
Marshall (Huntington, WV) – Thundering Herd
Nichols (Dudley, MA)
ND State (Fargo, ND)
OK Baptist (Shawnee, OK)
Southern Union State CC (Wadley, AL)
Wayne CC (Goldsboro, NC)

Buffaloes

AR Baptist (Little Rock, AR)
Colorado (Boulder)
Milligan (Johnson City, TN)
NE Indian CC (multicampus)
West Texas A&M (Canyon, TX)

Camels

Campbell (Buies Creek, NC) - Fighting Camels
CT College (New London, CT)

Cats (larger category, excluding Big Cats)

Anna Maria (Paxton, MA) – AMCats
Central NM CC (Albuquerque, NM)
Erie CC (Williamsville, NY) – Kats
Maranatha Baptist (Watertown, WI) – Sabercats
Rogers State (Claremore, OK) – Hillcats
Schoolcraft (Livonia, MI) – Ocelots
Thiel (Greenville, PA) – Tomcats

Cows (larger category)

Cal State Dominguez Hills (Carson, CA) - Toros
Clovis CC (Fresno, CA) - Crush
L.A. Pierce (Woodland Hills, CA) - Brahmas
Mesalands CC (Tucumcari, NM) - Stampede
Texas (Austin) - Longhorns
TX College (Tyler, TX) - Steers

Bulls

Chapingo (Texcoco, Mexico) - Wild Bulls
Johnson C. Smith (Charlotte, NC) – Golden Bulls
Buffalo (Buffalo, NY)
South Florida (Tampa)
Touro (multicampus)

Mavericks

CO Mesa (Grand Junction, CO)
Lone Star-Montgomery (The Woodlands, TX)
Medaille (Buffalo, NY)
Mercy (NY) (Dobbs Ferry, NY)
Midlands Tech (multicampus)
Minnesota State (Mankato)
Mitchell CC (Statesville, NC)
Mitchell Tech (Mitchell, SD)
OH State–Mansfield (Mansfield, OH)
NW KS Tech (Goodland, KS)
Omaha (Omaha, NE)
UT Arlington (Arlington, TX)

Coyotes

Cal State San Bernardino (San Bernardino, CA)
Cerro Coso CC (Ridgecrest, CA)
Chandler-Gilbert CC (Chandler, AZ)
College of ID (Caldwell, ID) – Yotes
Cuyamaca (Rancho San Diego, CA)
KS Wesleyan (Salina, KS)
La Cité (Ottawa)
Lake Tahoe CC (South Lake Tahoe, CA)
Okanagan (Kelowna)
South Dakota (Vermillion, SD)
Southern NV (Las Vegas)
Weatherford (Weatherford, TX)

Deer

Bucks

Arkansas-Rich Mountain (Mena, AR)
Motlow State CC (Lynchburg, TN)
Washington State CC (Marietta, OH)

Stags

Claremont McKenna-Harvey Mudd (joint men's teams)
Fairfield (Fairfield, CT)

Dogs (larger category)

Albany (Albany, NY) – Great Danes
Great Plains (multicampus) - SunDogs
John Jay (New York City) – Bloodhounds
Maryland–Baltimore County [UMBC] (Catonsville, MD) – Retrievers
ON Tech or UOIT (Oshawa, ON) – Ridgebacks
Pace (New York City) – Setters
Spartanburg (Spartanburg, SC - Border Collies
UW-Stevens Point (Stevens Point, WI) – Pointers

Bulldogs

Adrian (Adrian, MI)
AL A&M (Normal, AL)
Allan Hancock (Santa Maria, CA)
Barton (Wilson, NC)
Bellevue (WA) (Bellevue, WA)
Bergen CC (Bergen County, NJ)
Bowie State (Bowie, MD)
Boyce (Louisville, KY)
Brooklyn (Brooklyn)
Bryant (Smithfield, RI)
Bunker Hill CC (Boston)
Butler (Indianapolis)
The Citadel (Charleston, SC)
Clarendon (TX) (Clarendon, TX)
Concordia (NE) (Seward, NE)
Daley (Chicago)
Dean (Franklin, MA)
DeSales (Center Valley, PA)
Drake (Des Moines)
Ferris State (Big Rapids, MI)
Fisk (Nashville, TN)
Fresno State (Fresno, CA)
Gardner-Webb (Boiling Springs, NC) – Runnin' Bulldogs
Georgia (Athens, GA)
Gonzaga (Spokane, WA)
Holmes CC (multicampus)
Jarvis Christian (Hawkins, TX)
Kettering (Flint, MI)
Knoxville (Knoxville, TN)
LA Tech (Ruston, LA) (men's teams)
McPherson (McPherson, KS)
Minnesota–Duluth (Duluth, MN)
MS Gulf Coast CC (Perkinston, MS)
Mississippi State (near Starkville, postal address of MS State)
Montana-Western (Dillon, MT)
Navarro (Corsicana, TX)
Puerto Rico-Mayagüez (Mayagüez, Puerto Rico)
Redlands (Redlands, CA)
Samford (Homewood, AL)
San Mateo (San Mateo, CA)
SC State (Orangeburg, SC)
South Suburban (South Holland, IL)
SW OK State (Weatherford, OK)
Springfield (IL) (Springfield, IL)
Thaddeus Stevens Tech (Lancaster, PA)
TN Wesleyan (Athens, TN)
Texarkana (Texarkana, TX)
Texas Lutheran (Seguin, TX)
Tougaloo (Tougaloo, MS)
Truman (Kirksville, MO)
UNC Asheville (Asheville, NC)
Union (KY) (Barbourville, KY)
Union (TN) (Jackson, TN)
Wilberforce (Wilberforce, OH)
Wingate (Wingate, NC)
Yale (New Haven, CT)

Greyhounds

AR State Mid-South (West Memphis, AR)
Assumption (Worcester, MA)
Eastern NM (Portales, New Mexico)
Fort Scott CC (Fort Scott, KS)
Indianapolis (Indianapolis)
Loyola (MD) (Baltimore)
Moberly Area CC (Moberly, MO)
Moravian (Bethlehem, PA)

Huskies

Bloomsburg (Bloomsburg, PA)
East L.A. (Monterey Park, CA)
George Brown (Toronto)
Houston Christian (Houston)
Keyano (Fort McMurray, AB)
MI Tech (Houghton, MI)
Monroe County CC (Monroe Charter Township, MI & Temperance, MI)
Northeastern (Boston)
Northern IL (DeKalb, IL)
St. Cloud State (St. Cloud, MN)
St. Mary's (NS) (Halifax, NS)
Saskatchewan (Saskatoon)
Southern ME (Gorham, ME)
UConn (Storrs, CT)
UW–Marathon County (Wausau, WI)
Washington (Seattle)

Saints

D'Youville (Buffalo, NY)
Maryville (MO) (Town and Country)
Siena (Loudonville, NY)

Salukis

Southern IL (Carbondale)
SW TN CC (Memphis, TN)

Scotties

Agnes Scott (Decatur, GA)
Highland CC (KS) (Highland, KS)

Terriers

Boston University (Boston)
Hiram (Hiram, OH)
St. Francis Brooklyn (Brooklyn Heights)
Thomas (ME) (Waterville, ME)
Wofford (Spartanburg, SC)

Eagles (standalone category – multiple sub-categories)

Alice Lloyd (Pippa Passes, KY)
American (Washington, DC)
American National (multicampus)
Asbury (Wilmore, KY)
Ashland (Ashland, OH)
Avila (Kansas City, MO)
Baptist FL (Graceville, FL)
Bay Ridge Christian (Fort Bend County, TX)
Benedictine (IL) (Lisle, IL)
Biola (La Mirada, CA)
Bladen CC (Dublin, NC)
Boston College (Chestnut Hill, MA)
Bridgewater (Bridgewater, VA)
Carson–Newman (Jefferson City, TN)
Central Methodist (Fayette, MO)
Central TX (Killeen, TX)
Chadron State (Chadron, NE)
Clark State (Springfield, OH)
Coastal AL CC (Monroeville, AL)
CO Mountain (multicampus)
Concordia Irvine (Irvine, CA)
Coppin State (Baltimore)
Drake State CC/Tech (Huntsville, AL) - Blue Eagles
Dyersburg State CC (Dyersburg, TN)
Eastern (PA) (St. Davids, Pennsylvania)
Eastern Michigan (Ypsilanti, MI)
Eastern Washington (Cheney, WA)
Edgewood (Madison, WI)
Elmira (Elmira, NY) – Soaring Eagles
Embry-Riddle (multicampus)
Emmaus Bible (Dubuque, IA)
Emory (Atlanta)
Faith Baptist Bible (Ankeny, IA)
Faulkner (Montgomery, AL)
Florida Gulf Coast (Fort Myers)
Fort Lauderdale (Fort Lauderdale)
Georgia Southern (Statesboro, GA)
Hinds CC (Raymond, MS)
Houston CC (Houston)
IL Valley CC (Oglesby, IL)
Judson (IL) (Elgin, IL & Rockford, IL)
Juniata (Huntingdon, PA)
King's (AB) (Edmonton, AB)
Kirkwood CC (Cedar Rapids, IA)
Kwantlen Poly (multicampus)
Laney (Oakland, CA)
L.A. Mission (Los Angeles, CA)
Life (Marietta, GA) – Running Eagles
Mary Washington (Fredericksburg, VA)
Mendocino (Ukiah, CA)
Merchant Marine (Kings Point, NY) - Sea Eagles
Meridian CC (Meridian, MS)
Midway (Midway, KY)
Moncton (Moncton) – Aigles Bleu (Blue Eagles)
Morehead State (Morehead, KY)
Mt. San Jacinto (Riverside County, CA)
Niagara (NY) (Lewiston, NY)
NC Central (Durham, NC)
NE TX CC (Mount Pleasant, TX)
NE WI Tech (Green Bay, WI)
Northern NM (Española, NM)
NW AR CC (Bentonville, AR)
Northwest (WA) (Kirkland, WA)
Northwestern–St. Paul (Saint Paul, MN)
OK Christian (Oklahoma City, OK)
OK Wesleyan (Bartlesville, OK)
Ozarks Tech CC (Springfield, MO)
Pensacola Christian (Pensacola, FL)
Polk State (Winter Haven, FL)
Post (Waterbury, CT)
Reinhardt (Waleska, GA)
Richard Bland (Prince George, VA)
Rockingham CC (Wentworth, NC)
Saint Elizabeth (Morris Township, NJ & Florham Park, NJ)
Scott CC (Riverdale, IA)
Siskiyous (Weed, CA)
SK Indian Tech (Saskatoon)
SW Christian (OK) (Bethany, OK)
Stanly CC (Locust, NC)
State Tech MO (Linn, MO)
Tallahassee CC (Tallahassee, FL)
Texas A&M-Texarkana (Texarkana, TX)
Toronto-Mississauga (Mississauga, ON)
Trinity Baptist (Jacksonville, FL)
United States Sports Academy (Daphne, AL)
University of the Ozarks (Clarksville, AR)
Victory (Memphis, TN)
Wake Tech CC (Raleigh, NC)
West Coast Baptist (Lancaster, CA)
Western ID (Nampa, ID)
Williams Baptist (Walnut Ridge, AR)
Winthrop (Rock Hill, SC)
Woodland CC (Woodland, CA)

Águilas

España (Durango City)
Estado de Puebla (Puebla City) 
Guerrero (Chilpancingo de los Bravo)
Sinaloa (Culiacán)
Tecnológica México (multicampus)

Bald Eagles

Lock Haven (Lock Haven, PA)
Oxford Emory (Oxford, GA)

Golden Eagles

Cal State Los Angeles (Los Angeles)
Charleston (WV) (Charleston)
Chattahoochee Tech (Marietta, GA)
Clarion (Clarion, PA)
(CO State-Global (Aurora, CO)
Cornerstone (Grand Rapids)
Feather River (Quincy, CA)
John Brown (Siloam Springs, AR)
La Sierra (Riverside, CA)
Laramie County CC (Cheyenne, WY)
Marquette (Milwaukee)
Minnesota–Crookston (Crookston, MN)
NE IL (Chicago)
Oral Roberts (Tulsa, OK)
Rock Valley (Rockford, IL)
Southern ID (Twin Falls, ID)
Southern MS (Hattiesburg, MS)
Spalding (Louisville, KY)
St. Joseph's (Long Island) (Patchogue, NY)
SUNY Brockport (Brockport, NY)
Tennessee Tech (Cookeville)
UT State-Eastern (Price, UT)
UW-La Crosse (La Crosse, WI)
Warren County CC (Washington, NJ)
Washington County CC (Calais, ME)
West Hills Lemoore (Lemoore, CA)
White Mountains CC (multicampus)

Screaming Eagles

Southern Indiana (Evansville)
Toccoa Falls (Toccoa, GA)

Foxes

Centro de Enseñanza Técnica y Superior (multicampus) - Zorros
Fox Valley Tech (Appleton, WI)
KY CC/Tech System (multicampus)
Sweet Briar (Sweet Briar, Virginia) – Vixen
West Shore CC (Scottville, MI)

Red Foxes

CC Aurora (Aurora, CO)
Marist (Poughkeepsie, NY)
Red Rocks CC (Lakewood, CO)

Hawks (standalone category – multiple sub-categories)

Bristol CC (Fall River, MA) - Bayhawks
CC Denver (Denver) - CityHawks
Coe (Cedar Rapids, IA) – Kohawks
Columbia Basin (Pasco, WA)
Cosumnes River (Sacramento, CA)
DE Tech CC-Terry (Dover, DE)
Dickinson State (Dickinson, ND) – Blue Hawks
Evergreen Valley (San Jose, CA)
Hartford (Hartford, CT)
Hagerstown CC (Hagerstown, MD)
Harper (Palatine, IL)
Harrisburg Area CC (Harrisburg, PA)
Hartwick (Oneonta, NY)
Hawkeye CC (Waterloo, IA) - Red-tailed Hawks
Heartland CC (Normal, IL)
Hilbert (Hamburg, NY)
Hillsborough CC (Tampa, FL)
Henry Ford (Dearborn, MI)
Hocking (Nelsonville, OH)
Hodges (Naples, FL & Fort Myers, FL)
Holy Names (Oakland, CA)
Housatonic CC (Bridgeport, CT)
Houston-Clear Lake (Houston)
Howard (Big Spring, TX)
Humber (Toronto)
Hunter (Manhattan)
Huntingdon (Montgomery, AL)
Illinois Tech (Chicago)
Indiana (PA) (Indiana, PA) – Crimson Hawks
Lake–Sumter State (Leesburg, FL) – Lakehawks
Lake Superior (Duluth, MN) - IceHawks
Las Positas (Livermore, CA)
Lehigh (Bethlehem, PA) – Mountain Hawks
Loras (Dubuque, IA) – Duhawks
Malcolm X (Chicago)
Maryland Eastern Shore (Princess Anne, MD)
Miami-Hamilton (Hamilton, OH) – Harriers
Mohawk Valley CC (Utica, NY)
Monmouth (NJ) (West Long Branch, NJ)
North Dakota (Grand Forks, ND) – Fighting Hawks
Northeast CC (Norfolk, NE)
Oaxaca Tech (Oaxaca) - Halcónes
Puerto Rico-Utuado (Utuado, Puerto Rico) - Guaraguaos
Quincy (Quincy, IL)
Roanoke-Chowan CC (Ahoskie, NC)
Rockhurst (Kansas City, MO)
Rockland CC (Suffern, NY)
Roger Williams (Bristol, RI)
Saint Anselm (Goffstown, NH)
Saint Joseph's (PA) (Philadelphia)
San Diego Christian (Santee, CA)
Santiago Canyon (Orange, CA)
Shorter (AR) (North Little Rock, AR)
Shorter (GA) (Rome, GA)
SE CC (IA) (Burlington, IA & Keokuk, IA)
South GA State (Douglas, GA & Waycross, GA)
Southern MD (multicampus)
SUNY New Paltz (New Paltz, NY)
Tri-County Tech (Pendleton, SC)
Viterbo (La Crosse, WI) – V-Hawks
UT Southern (Pulaski, TN) – FireHawks
Wilfrid Laurier (Waterloo, ON) – Golden Hawks
York County CC (Wells, ME)

Jayhawks

Jamestown CC (Jamestown, NY)
Muskegon CC (Muskegon, MI)
Kansas (Lawrence)

Nighthawks

 National Park (Hot Springs, AR)
 North Georgia (Dahlonega)
 Northern VA CC (Annandale, VA)
 Northwest Nazarena (Nampa, ID)
 Thomas (GA) (Thomasville, GA)

Red Hawks

Benedictine Mesa (Mesa, AZ) 
Catawba Valley CC (Hickory, NC)
Gateway Tech (multicampus)
LaGuardia CC (Long Island City, NY)
La Roche (McCandless Township, PA)
Lake Michigan (Benton Township, MI)
Miami(OH) (Oxford, OH) – RedHawks
Montclair State (Montclair, NJ) 
Ripon (Ripon, WI) 
Roberts Wesleyan (Rochester, NY) 
Seattle (Seattle) – Redhawks
Simpson (CA) (Redding, CA)
Southeast Missouri (Cape Girardeau, MO) – Redhawks

River Hawks

Susquehanna (Selinsgrove, PA)
UMass Lowell (Lowell, MA)

Riverhawks

Anne Arundel CC (Arnold, MD)
Northeastern State (Tahlequah, OK)
Umpqua CC (Roseburg, OR)
West Virginia-Parkersburg (Parkersburg, WV)

Seahawks

Broward (Davie, FL)
Cabrillo (Aptos, CA)
Cecil (Bay View, Maryland)
Keiser (West Palm Beach, FL) 
Lamar State-Port Arthur (Port Arthur, TX)
L.A. Harbor (Wilmington, CA)
St. Mary's (MD) (St. Mary's City, MD)
Salve Regina (Newport, RI)
UNC Wilmington (Wilmington, NC)
Wagner (Staten Island)
Memorial Newfoundland (St. John's, NL) – Sea-Hawks

Skyhawks

Atlanta Tech (Atlanta, GA)
Fort Lewis (Durango, CO)
Navajo Tech (Crownpoint, NM)
Point (West Point, GA)
Sauk Valley CC (Dixon, IL)
Stonehill (Easton, MA)
UT Martin (Martin, TN)

Thunderhawks

Confederation (Thunder Bay, ON)
Miami-Middletown (Middletown, OH)

Warhawks

Auburn Montgomery (Montgomery, AL)
Calhoun CC (Decatur, AL)
Coastal AL East CC (Brewton, AL)
McMurry (Abilene, TX) -War Hawks
Louisiana-Monroe [aka ULM] (Monroe, LA)
Wisconsin–Whitewater (Whitewater)

Horses/Mules (larger category)

Arkansas Hope-Texarkana (Hope, AR & Texarkana, AR) - Iron Horse
Central Missouri (Warrensburg, MO) – Jennies and Mules
Colby (Waterville, ME) - White Mules
Muhlenberg (Allentown, PA) – Mules
Murray State (Murray, KY) – Racers
Ottawa (ON) (Ottawa) – Gee-Gees
Polytechnic Mexico (Mexico City) - Burros Blancos

Broncos

Boise State (Boise, ID)
Bronx CC (The Bronx)
Cal Poly Pomona (Pomona, CA)
Central Oklahoma (Edmond, OK) – Bronchos
Fayetteville State (Fayetteville, NC)
Hastings (Hastings, NE)
Olds (Olds, AB)
Rider (Lawrenceville, NJ) – Broncs
Santa Clara (Santa Clara, CA)
SUNY-Delhi (Delhi, NY)
Western MI (Kalamazoo, MI)

Colts

Cañada (Redwood City, CA)
Centennial (Toronto)
Cossatot CC (De Queen, AR) 
Middlesex (Edison, NJ)
SUNY Orange (Middletown, NY)

Mustangs

Cal Poly San Luis Obispo, (San Luis Obispo, CA)
Central Baptist (Conway, AR) - Mustangs and Lady Mustangs
Central ME CC (Auburn, ME)
Los Medanos (Pittsburg, CA)
Master's (Santa Clarita, CA)
Midwestern State, (Wichita Falls, TX)
Monroe (New York City)
Montgomery County CC (Blue Bell, PA)
Morningside, (Sioux City, IA)
Mount Mercy, (Cedar Rapids, IA)
Norco (Norco, CA)
NE AL CC (Rainsville, AL)
San Joaquin Delta (Stockton, CA)
Sisseton Wahpeton (Sisseton, SD)
Southern Methodist (University Park, TX)
Southwest (Hobbs, NM)
SW MN State (Marshall, MN)
Stevenson (Stevenson, MD)
SUNY Morrisville (Morrisville, NY)
Western ON, (London, ON)
Western NM, (Silver City, New Mexico)
Western WY CC, (Rock Springs, WY)

Palominos

Laredo (Laredo, TX)
Palo Alto (San Antonio)

Ponies

Morelia Tech (Morelia, Mexico)
Panola (Carthage, TX)

Stallions

Abraham Baldwin (Tifton, GA)
North American (Stafford, TX)

Thoroughbreds

KY State (Frankfort, KY) – Thorobreds and Thorobrettes
Skidmore (Saratoga Springs, NY)

Insects

Atlantic (Bar Harbor, ME) - Black Flies
Emory and Henry (Emory, VA) – Wasps
Oaxaca Tech (Oaxaca City) - Chapulíns
Seneca (Toronto) - The Sting
South Carolina-Sumter (Sumter, SC) - Fire Ants

Bees

Baltimore (Baltimore, MD) (no sports teams)
Eastfield (Mesquite, TX) - Harvesters
Guanajuato (Guanajuato City) 
SCAD (Savannah, GA)
St. Ambrose (Davenport, IA) – Fightin' Bees

Boll Weevils

 Arkansas–Monticello (Monticello, AR) (men's teams)
 Enterprise State CC (Enterprise, AL)

Hornets

AL State (Montgomery, AL) - Hornets & Lady Hornets
DE State (Dover, DE)
Emporia State (Emporia, KS)
Fullerton (Fullerton, CA)
Harris-Stowe State (St. Louis)
Kalamazoo (Kalamazoo, MI)
Lynchburg (Lynchburg, VA)
Morris (SC) (Sumter, SC)
Northern Vermont–Lyndon (Lyndon, VT)
Sacramento State (Sacramento, CA)
Shenandoah (Winchester, VA)
SUNY Broome (Dickinson, Waverly, and Owego, NY)

Stingers

Concordia (Montreal) (Montreal)
Florence-Darlington Tech (Florence, SC)

Yellow Jackets

Allen (Columbia, SC)
American International (Springfield, MA)
Baldwin Wallace (Berea, OH)
Black Hills State (Spearfish, SD)
Cedarville (Cedarville, OH)
Defiance (Defiance, OH)
Georgia Tech (Atlanta)
Graceland (Lamoni, IA)
Howard Payne (Brownwood, TX)
LeTourneau (Longview, TX)
Randolph-Macon (Ashland, VA)
Waynesburg (Waynesburg, PA)
WV State (Institute, WV)
UW-Superior (Superior, WI)

Yellowjackets

MT State-Billings (Billings)
Rochester CC/Tech (Rochester, MN)
Rochester (Rochester, NY)

Lions (standalone category - multiple sub-categories)

Ambrose (Calgary, AB)
American Jewish (Bel-Air, Los Angeles, California)
Anáhuac (Mexico City) 
Arkansas-Fort Smith (Fort Smith, AR)
Bryan (Dayton, TN)
Bryn Athyn (Bryn Athyn, PA)
Champlain St. Lawrence (Quebec City)
College of NJ (Ewing, NJ)
Columbia (NY) (New York City)
CC Baltimore County-Dundalk (Dundalk, MD)
CC Philadelphia (Philadelphia)
East MS CC (Scooba, MS)
Eastern Mennonite (Harrisonburg, VA)
Eastern Nazarene (Quincy, MA)
Emerson (Boston)
Emmanuel (GA) (Franklin Springs, GA)
Finlandia (Hancock, MI)
FL Memorial (Miami Gardens, FL)
Freed-Hardeman (Henderson, TN)
Gateway CC (New Haven, CT)
Georgian Court (Lakewood Township, NJ)
Guadalajara (Guadalajara) - Leones Negros
King's (NY) (New York City)
Lambton (Sarnia, ON)
Langston (Langston, OK)
Lincoln (PA) (Chester County, PA)
Lincoln Christian (Lincoln, IL) (Red Lions)
Lindenwood (MO) (Saint Charles, MO)
Loma Linda (Loma Linda, CA)
Loyola Marymount (Los Angeles)
Mars Hill (Mars Hill, NC)
Missouri Southern (Joplin, MO)
Molloy (Long Island)
Moreno Valley (Moreno Valley, CA)
Mount St. Joseph (Delhi Township, OH)
Mountain View (Dallas)
Multnomah (Portland, OR)
Nassau CC (Garden City, NY)
Normandale CC (Bloomington, MN)
North Central TX (Gainesville, TX)
North Alabama (Florence, AL)
Paine (Augusta, GA)
Penn State (multicampus) – Nittany Lions
Piedmont (Demorest, GA)
Pierpont CC/Tech (Fairmont, WV)
Puerto Rico-Ponce (Ponce, Puerto Rico)
Red Deer Poly (Red Deer, AB)
Saint Leo (St. Leo, FL)
Soka (Aliso Viejo, CA)
SE LA (Hammond, LA)
SW Assemblies of God (Waxahachie, TX)
TX A&M-Commerce (Commerce, TX)
Trinity Bible (Ellendale, ND)
Vanguard (Costa Mesa, CA)
Wallace State CC (Hanceville, AL)
York (Toronto) (Toronto)

Golden Lions

Arkansas-Pine Bluff (Pine Bluff, AR)
Raritan Valley CC (North Branch, NJ)

Lyons

Mount Holyoke (South Hadley, MA)
Wheaton (MA) (Norton, MA)

Pride

Clarke (Dubuque, IA)
Greensboro (Greensboro, NC)
Hofstra (Hempstead, NY)
Lowcountry Tech (Beaufort, SC)
Purdue Northwest (Hammond and Westville, IN)
Regis (MA) (Weston, MA)
Springfield (MA) (Springfield, MA)
Widener (Chester, PA)

Marine animals (larger category)

Alaska-Southeast (Juneau, AK) - Humpback Whales
Coastal Pines Tech (Waycross, GA) - Rays
Columbia Gorge CC (The Dalles, OR) - Chinooks
ETS (Montreal) - Piranhas
Evergreen State (Olympia, WA) – Geoducks
New School (New York City) - Narwhals
Palm Beach Atlantic (West Palm Beach, FL) – Sailfish
Point Loma Nazarene (San Diego, CA) - Sea Lions
SCF Manatee (Bradenton, FL) – Manatees
Virginia Wesleyan (Norfolk, VA) - Marlins
South Carolina-Beaufort (Beaufort, SC) – Sand Sharks
Whatcom CC (Bellingham, WA) - Orcas

Dolphins

Albemarle (multicampus)
Alvin CC (Alvin, TX)
Brunswick CC (Bolivia, NC)
Cal State Channel Islands (Camarillo, CA) (no sports teams)
Carmen (Ciudad del Carmen)
Coastline CC (Fountain Valley, CA)
Delgado CC (New Orleans)
Jacksonville (Jacksonville, FL)
Le Moyne (Syracuse, NY)
Mount Saint Vincent (NY) (Riverdale, Bronx)
Sagrado Corazón (San Juan, Puerto Rico)
Shoreline CC (Shoreline, WA)
Staten Island (Staten Island)
Tamaulipas Higher Ed (Altamira, Mexico) - Delfines
Wor-Wic CC (Salisbury, MD)

Muskies

Lakeland (WI) (Sheboygan, WI)
Muskingum (New Concord, OH)

Sharks

Cape Cod CC (West Barnstable, MA) (no sports)
HI Pacific (Honolulu)
Landmark (Putney, VT)
LIU (Brooklyn and Brookville, NY)
Miami Dade (Miami)
Nova Southeastern (Fort Lauderdale, FL)
OR Coast CC (Newport, OR)
Puerto Rico-Aguadilla (Aguadilla, Puerto Rico)
SEARK (Pine Bluff, AR)
Simmons (MA) (Boston)
Suffolk County CC (Selden, NY)

Marsupials (larger category)

Columbia (SC) (Columbia, SC) – Koalas
UW–Green Bay, Sheboygan (Sheboygan, WI) – Wombats

Kangaroos

Austin (Sherman, TX)
Kansas City (Kansas City, Missouri) - Roos
SUNY Canton (Canton, NY)

Moose

Granite State (Concord, NH)
Maine-Augusta (Augusta, ME)
NW CT CC (Winsted, CT)

Otters

Alamance CC (Haw River, NC) - River Otters
Cal State Monterey Bay (Marina/Seaside, CA)

Prehistoric animals (larger category)

Amherst (Amherst, MA) – Mammoths
Calgary (Calgary) – Dinos
Cuyahoga CC (Cuyahoga County, OH) - Triceratops

Mastodons

MA Art/Design
Purdue Fort Wayne (Fort Wayne, IN)

Rams

Angelo State (San Angelo, TX) – Rams and Rambelles
A.T. Still (Kirksville, MO)
Bluefield (Bluefield, VA)
Columbia International (Columbia, SC)
CO State (Fort Collins, CO)
Cornell (IA) (Mount Vernon, IA)
East Coast Poly (Virginia Beach, VA)
Fordham (The Bronx)
Framingham State (Framingham, MA)
Fresno City (Fresno, CA)
Gavilan (Gilroy, CA)
Hampshire (Amherst, MA) - Black Sheep
Huston-Tillotson (Austin, TX)
Jefferson (PA) (Philadelphia)
Mobile (Mobile, AL)
Monterrey Tech (Monterrey)
North Central (MN) (Minneapolis)
Rhode Island (Kingston, RI)
San Francisco City College (San Francisco)
Shepherd (Shepherdstown, WV)
SE CC (NC) (Whiteville, NC)
SW Christian (TX) (Terrell, TX)
Springfield Tech CC (Springfield, MA)
Suffolk (Boston)
SUNY Farmingdale (Farmingdale, NY)
Toronto Metropolitan (Toronto)
TX Wesleyan (Fort Worth)
Unity (Unity, ME)
VCU (Richmond, VA)
Victor Valley (Victorville, CA)
Wilbur Wright (Chicago)
Winston-Salem State (Winston-Salem)

Bighorn Sheep

Baja California (multicampus)
Great Basin (Elko, NV)

Golden Rams

Albany State (Albany, GA)
Anoka-Ramsey CC (Coon Rapids, MN & Cambridge, MN)
West Chester (West Chester, PA)

Rodents (larger category)

Bryant & Stratton (Cleveland) – Lemmings
Metropolitan State (MN) (multicampus) - Muskrats

Beavers

American River (Sacramento, CA)
Babson (Wellesley, MA)
Bemidji State (Bemidji, MN)
Blackburn (Carlinville, IL) – Battlin' Beavers
Bluffton (Bluffton, OH)
Buena Vista (Storm Lake, IA)
Caltech (Pasadena, CA)
City NY (New York City)
Champlain (Burlington, VT)
L.A. Trade-Tech (Los Angeles, CA)
Maine Farmington (Farmington, ME)
MIT (Cambridge, MA)
Minot State (Minot, ND)
Oregon State (Corvallis, OR)
Polytechnic University of Puerto Rico (San Juan, Puerto Rico)
Pratt CC (Pratt, KS)
Trenholm State CC (Montgomery, AL)

Gophers

Goucher (Towson, MD)
Minnesota-Twin Cities (Minneapolis and Saint Paul, MN) – Golden Gophers
Zacatecas (Zacatecas City) - Tuzos

Squirrels

Mary Baldwin (Staunton, VA) – Fighting Squirrels
Union Seminary (Richmond, VA)

Scorpions

NV State (Henderson, NV)
TX Southmost (Brownsville, TX)

Snakes (larger category)

Boréal (Sudbury, ON) - Vipères
FL Southern (Lakeland, FL) – Moccasins

Cobras

Caldwell CC/Tech (Hudson, NC)
Coker (Hartsville, SC)
Parkland (Champaign, IL)

Rattlers

Florida A&M (Tallahassee, FL)
Medicine Hat (Medicine Hat, AB)
Otero (La Junta, CO)
St. Mary's (TX) (San Antonio)
UW–Rock County (Janesville, WI)

Tigers (standalone category - multiple sub-categories)

Auburn (Auburn, AL)
Benedict (Columbia, SC)
Campbellsville (Campbellsville, KY)
Casa Blanca (Culiacán) - White Tigers
Central Christian (KS) (McPherson, KS)
Champion Christian (Hot Springs, AR)
Chattanooga State CC (Chattanooga, TN)
Clemson (Clemson, SC)
Coahoma CC (Coahoma County, MS)
CO College (Colorado Springs)
Cowley CC (Arkansas City, KS)
Dakota Wesleyan (Mitchell, SD)
Dalhousie (Halifax, NS)
DePauw (Greencastle, IN)
Doane (Crete, NE)
East Central (OK) (Ada, OK)
East TX Baptist (Marshall, TX)
Edward Waters (Jacksonville, FL)
Fairfax America (Fairfax, VA)
FIT (New York City)
Fort Hays State (Hays, KS)
Georgetown (KY) (Georgetown, KY)
Grace Christian (Grand Rapids)
Grambling State (Grambling, LA)
Hampden–Sydney (Hampden Sydney, VA)
Holy Family (Philadelphia)
Interamerican PR (San German, PR)
Iowa Wesleyan (Mount Pleasant, IA)
Jackson State (Jackson, MS)
Lincoln (MO) (Jefferson City, MO) - Blue Tigers
LSU (Baton Rouge) - Tigers and Lady Tigers
Marion Military (Marion, AL)
Marshalltown CC (Marshalltown, IA)
Memphis (Memphis, TN)
Missouri (Columbia, MO)
Morehouse (Atlanta) - Maroon Tigers
NE MS CC (Booneville, MS)
New England Tech (East Greenwich, RI)
Nuevo León (San Nicolás de los Garza)
Occidental (Los Angeles)
Olivet Nazarene (Bourbonnais, IL)
Ouachita Baptist (Arkadelphia, AR)
Pacific (Stockton, CA)
Paul Quinn (Dallas)
Princeton (Princeton, NJ)
Queensborough CC (Queens)
Reedley (Reedley, CA)
Riverside City (Riverside, CA)
Rochester Tech (Rochester, NY)
Roxbury CC (Roxbury, Boston, Massachusetts)
St. Philip's (San Antonio)
Salem (Salem, WV)
Savannah State (Savannah, GA)
Sewanee (Sewanee, TN)
Southern Crescent Tech (Griffin, GA & Thomaston, GA)
Sowela Tech CC (Lake Charles, LA) - Flying Tigers
Stillman (Tuscaloosa, AL)
TN State (Nashville, TN)
TX Southern (Houston)
Towson (Towson, MD)
Trinity (TX) (San Antonio)
Trinity (FL) (New Port Richey, FL)
Trinity Washington (Washington D.C.)
Voorhees (Denmark, SC)
West Alabama (Livingston, AL)
Wittenberg (Springfield, OH)
Zane State (Zanesville, OH & Cambridge, OH)

Bengals

Buffalo State (Buffalo, NY)
ID State (Pocatello, ID)
LSU-Eunice (Eunice, LA)
Maine–Fort Kent (Fort Kent, ME)

Fighting Tigers

Andrew (Cuthbert, GA)
SUNY Cobleskill (Cobleskill, NY)

Golden Tigers

Brenau (Gainesville, GA)
Tuskegee (Tuskegee, AL)

Wild Pigs

Arkansas (Fayetteville, AR) – Razorbacks
Texas A&M-Kingsville (Kingsville, TX) – Javelinas

Wolverines

Essex County (Newark, NJ)
Grove City (Grove City, PA)
Michigan (Ann Arbor, MI)
Morris Brown (Atlanta)
San Bernardino Valley (San Bernardino, CA)
Sierra (Rocklin, CA)
Utah Valley (Orem, UT)

Wolves (larger category)

Algonquin (Ottawa)
Alvernia (Reading, PA) – Golden Wolves
Cardinal Stritch (Fox Point, WI & Glendale, WI)
Cheyney (Cheyney, Pennsylvania)
Franciscan Missionaries of Our Lady (Baton Rouge)
Front Range CC (Westminster, CO)
Grande Prairie Regional (Grande Prairie, AB)
Joliet Junior (Joliet, IL)
Keuka (Keuka Park, New York)
Lourdes (Sylvania, OH) - Gray Wolves
Metropolitan CC (MO) (multicampus)
Moraine Park Tech (Fond du Lac, WI)
NE Wesleyan (Lincoln, NE) – Prairie Wolves
Newberry (Newberry, SC)
North GA Tech (Clarkesville, GA)
Northern State (Aberdeen, SD)
Puerto Rico-Arecibo (Arecibo, Puerto Rico)
VA Highlands CC (Abingdon, VA)
Walla Walla (Walla Walla, WA)
Washtenaw CC (Ann Arbor Charter Township, MI) - Alphas
Western Oregon (Monmouth, OR)
West Georgia (Carrollton, GA)
Wesleyan (GA) (Macon, GA)

Lobos

Durango (Durango City)
Iberoamericana (Mexico City) 
Meritorious Autonomous Puebla (Puebla, Mexico)
Monterey Peninsula (Monterey, CA)
New Mexico (Albuquerque)
Sul Ross State (Alpine, TX)

Red Wolves

Arkansas State (Jonesboro, AR)
IU East (Richmond, IN)

Seawolves

Alaska-Anchorage (Anchorage)
Sonoma State (Rohnert Park, CA)
Southern ME CC (South Portland, ME)
SUNY Stony Brook (Stony Brook, NY)

Thunderwolves

Colorado State–Pueblo (Pueblo, CO) – ThunderWolves
Lakehead (Thunder Bay)
Niagara County CC (Sanborn, NY)

Timberwolves

Arkansas CC-Morrilton (Morrilton, AR)
Blue Mountain CC (Pendleton, OR)
FL Gateway (Lake City, FL)
Lone Star-Tomball (Tomball, TX)
North Central MI (Petoskey, MI)
Northcentral Tech (Wausau, WI)
Northern BC (Prince George, BC)
Northwood (Midland, MI)
SUNY Adirondack (Queensbury, NY)

Wolf Pack/Wolfpack

Copiah-Lincoln CC (Wesson, MS)
Loyola New Orleans (New Orleans) – Wolfpack
Madison Area Tech (Madison, WI)
Nevada-Reno (Reno) – Wolf Pack
NC State (Raleigh, NC) – Wolfpack
Thompson Rivers (Kamloops) – WolfPack
Westmoreland County CC (Youngwood, PA)

Colors

Laval (Quebec City) - Rouge et Or
Sherbrooke (Sherbrooke, QC) - Vert et Or
Syracuse (Syracuse, NY) - Orange
UW-Eau Claire (Eau Claire, WI) - Blugolds

Blue (larger category)

Bluefield State (Bluefield, WV) – Big Blue and Lady Blues
Illinois College (Jacksonville) – Blueboys and Lady Blues
John Carroll (Cleveland) – Blue Streaks
Millikin (Decatur, IL) – Big Blue
Toronto (Toronto) – Varsity Blues
Wellesley (Wellesley, MA) – Blue

Blues

Brookdale CC (Lincroft, NJ)
Capilano (North Vancouver, BC)
Dawson (Montreal)
MUW (Columbus, MS)
Whitman (Walla Walla, WA)

Gold (larger category)

Kent State (Kent, OH) - Golden Flashes
Nazareth (Pittsford, NY) - Golden Flyers

Green (larger category)

Dartmouth (Hanover, NH) – Big Green
McDaniel (Westminster, MD) – Green Terror
North TX (Denton, TX) – Mean Green

Purple (larger category)

Evansville (Evansville, IN) - Purple Aces
NYU (New York City) - Violets

Red (larger category)

Harvard (Cambridge, MA) – Crimson
Henderson State (Arkadelphia, AR) – Reddies and Lady Reddies
New Brunswick (Fredericton) – Varsity Reds
Saint Francis (PA) (Loretto, PA) – Red Flash
Stanford (Palo Alto, CA) – Cardinal
Swarthmore (Swarthmore, PA) - Garnet

Big Red

Cornell (NY) (Ithaca, NY)
Denison (Granville, OH)

Maroons

Roanoke (Salem, VA)
UChicago (Chicago)

Legendary, religious and supernatural figures

Alaska-Fairbanks (Fairbanks) – Nanooks
Alexandria Tech/CC (Alexandria, MN) - Legends
CC Spokane (Spokane, WA) - Sasquatch
Cleveland CC (Shelby, NC) - Yetis
Coastal Carolina (Conway, SC) - Chanticleers
Converse (Spartanburg, SC) - Valkyries
McGill (Montreal) (women only) - Martlets
Penn State Abington (Abington, PA) - Little Johns
River Parishes CC (Gonzales, LA) - Rougarous
Saint Louis (St. Louis) - Billikens
Trent (Peterborough, ON) - Excalibur
Trinity Christian (Palos Heights, IL) - Trolls
Tyndale (Toronto) - Guardians
UArts (Philadelphia) - Unicorns
Webster (Webster Groves) - Gorloks

Ancient Greece and Ancient Rome (larger category)

Claremont McKenna-Harvey Mudd-Scripps (joint women's team) – Athenas
San Diego Mesa (San Diego, CA) - Olympians
Mount St. Mary's(CA) (Los Angeles, CA) (no varsity teams) - Athenians

Argonauts

Providence (MT) (Great Falls, MT)
Notre Dame de Namur (Belmont, CA)
West FL (Pensacola, FL)

Centurions

Bucks County CC (Bucks County, PA)
Montcalm CC (Sidney, Michigan)

Gladiators

Atlantic UC Guaynabo, Puerto Rico)
Chabot (Hayward, CA)

Spartans

Aurora (Aurora, IL)
Dubuque (Dubuque, IA)
Case Western Reserve (Cleveland)
Castleton (Castleton, VT)
Cayuga CC (Auburn, NY)
CO NW CC (Craig, and Rangely, CO)
Elgin CC (Elgin, IL)
James Sprunt CC (Kenansville, NC)
Manchester (North Manchester, IN)
MiraCosta (Oceanside, CA)
Michigan State (East Lansing)
MN State CC/Tech (multicampus)
MO Baptist (Creve Coeur, MO)
Norfolk State (Norfolk, VA)
Northampton CC (Bethlehem, PA)
NE Tech (Cheraw, SC)
San Jose State (San Jose, CA)
Stark State (Jackson Township, Ohio)
St. Thomas Aquinas (Sparkill, New York)
SW CC (IA) (Creston, IA)
Tampa (Tampa, FL)
Trinity Western (Langley, BC)
UNC Greensboro (Greensboro, NC)
USC Upstate (Spartanburg, SC)
Vieux Montréal (Montreal) - Spartiates
York (PA) (Spring Garden Township, PA)

Titans

Albany Tech (Albany, GA)
Cal State Fullerton (Fullerton, CA)
CC Morris (Randolph, NJ)
Central Carolina Tech (Sumter, SC)
Central GA Tech (Warner Robins, GA)
Central OH Tech (Newark, OH)
Detroit Mercy (Detroit)
Eastern FL State (Melbourne, FL)
Guilford Tech CC (Piedmont Triad)
IU South Bend (South Bend, IN)
Illinois Wesleyan (Bloomington, IL)
Lane CC (Eugene, OR)
OH State–Newark (Newark, OH)
St Pete (St. Petersburg, FL)
Tacoma CC (Tacoma, WA)
Terra State CC (Fremont, OH)
UW-Oshkosh (Oshkosh, WI)
Westminster (PA) (New Wilmington, PA)
CC Beaver County (Monaca, PA)

Tritons

Eckerd (St. Petersburg, FL)
Edmonds (Lynnwood, WA)
Guam (Mangilao, Guam)
IA Central CC (Fort Dodge, IA)
Missouri-St. Louis (St. Louis County, MO)
UC San Diego (La Jolla, CA)

Trojans

Allegany MD (Cumberland, MD)
Anderson (Anderson, SC)
Central AL CC (Alexander City, AL)
Colby CC (Colby, KS)
Dakota State (Madison, SD)
Everett CC (Everett, WA)
Fayetteville Tech CC (Fayetteville, NC)
Hannibal-LaGrange (Hannibal, MO)
Little Rock (Little Rock, Arkansas)
Monterrey (Monterrey) - Troyanos
Mount Olive (Mount Olive, NC)
MS Delta CC (Moorhead, MS)
North IA Area CC (Mason City, IA)
Seminole State (Seminole, OK)
Skyline (San Bruno, CA)
Southern AB Tech (Calgary, AB)
Taylor (Upland, IN)
Trevecca Nazarene (Nashville)
Trinidad State (Trinidad, CO & Alamosa, CO)
Trinity International (Deerfield, IL)
Triton (River Grove, IL)
Troy (Troy, AL)
USC (Los Angeles)
VA State (Petersburg, VA)

Vulcans

Hawaii-Hilo (Hilo, HI)
California (PA) (California, PA)

Christian symbols/figures (larger category)

Gogebic CC (Ironwood, MI) – Samsons
Meredith (Raleigh, NC) – Avenging Angels
Providence (RI) (Providence, RI) – Friars
Saint Joseph's ME (Standish, ME) – Monks
Snead State CC (Boaz, AL) – Parsons

Battling Bishops

NC Wesleyan (Rocky Mount, NC)
OH Wesleyan (Delaware, OH)

Blue Angels

New Rochelle (New Rochelle, NY)
Kaskaskia (Kaskaskia, IL)
Mount Mary (Milwaukee, WI)

Crusades/Crusaders

Belmont Abbey (Belmont, NC)
Capital (Columbus, OH)
Christendom (Front Royal, VA)
Dallas  (Irving, TX)
Dallas Christian (Farmers Branch, TX)
Evangel (Springfield, MO)
Great Lakes Christian (Delta Township, Michigan)
Holy Cross (MA) (Worcester, MA)
Madonna (Livonia, MI)
Mary Hardin-Baylor (Belton, TX)
North Greenville (Tigerville, SC)
NW Nazarene (Nampa, ID) – replaced by Nighthawks
William Carey (Hattiesburg, MS)

Deacons

New Hope (Eugene, OR)
Wake Forest (Winston-Salem) – Demon Deacons

Evangels/Preachers

Concordia Seminary (St. Louis, MO) – Preachers
Johnson (Knoxville, TN) – Preachers and Evangels
Mid-America Christian (Oklahoma City, OK) – Evangels

Fighting Saints

Carroll (MT) (Helena, MT)
St. Francis (IL) (Joliet, IL)

Saints

Aquinas (MI) (Grand Rapids)
Ashford (San Diego, CA)
Central Christian Bible (Moberly, MO)
Emmanuel (MA) (Boston)
Flagler (St. Augustine, FL)
Holy Cross (IN) (Notre Dame, IN)
Limestone (Gaffney, SC)
Lurleen B. Wallace CC (Andalusia, AL)
Marymount (VA) (Arlington, VA)
Mission (Santa Clara, CA)
Mt. Hood CC (Gresham, OR)
North Country CC (Saranac Lake, NY)
Our Lady of the Lake (San Antonio, TX)
Presentation (Aberdeen, SD)
Saint Lawrence (Canton, NY)
Saint Martin's (Lacey, WA)
Santa Fe (Gainesville, FL)
Santa Fe CC (Santa Fe, NM)
Seward County CC (Liberal, KS)
Shawnee CC (Ullin, IL)
Siena Heights (Adrian, MI)
St. Scholastica (Duluth, MN)
Thomas More (Crestview Hills, KY)

Demons and Devils

AZ State (Tempe) – Sun Devils
Cape Fear CC (Wilmington, NC) – Sea Devils
MS Valley State (Itta Bena, MS) – Delta Devils and Devilettes
Northwestern State (Natchitoches, LA) – Demons
TX A&M International (Laredo, TX) – DustDevils

Blue Demons

DePaul (Chicago)
Marianopolis (Westmount, Quebec)

Blue Devils

Central Connecticut (New Britain)
Dillard (New Orleans) – Bleu Devils
Duke (Durham, NC)
Kansas City CC (KS) (Kansas City, KS)
Kaskaskia (Kaskaskia, IL) (men's teams only)
Lawrence Tech (Southfield, MI)
Merced (Merced, CA) - Blue Devils & Lady Devils
Riverland CC (multicampus)
SUNY Fredonia (Fredonia, NY)
King's (NS) (Halifax, NS)
UW-Manitowoc (Manitowoc, WI)
UW-Stout (Menomonie, WI)

Red Devils

Allen County (Iola, KS)
Dickinson (Carlisle, PA)
Eureka (Eureka, IL)
Lower Columbia (Longview, WA)

Dragons

Cambrian (Greater Sudbury)
Donnelly (Kansas City, KS)
Drexel (Philadelphia)
Howard (Columbia, MD)
Hutchinson CC (Hutchinson, KS) – Blue Dragons
Lane (Jackson, TN)
MN State–Moorhead (Moorhead, MN)
Paris Junior (Paris, TX)
Quinsigamond CC (Worcester, MA) – Wyverns
Sainte-Anne (Pointe-de-l'Église, Nova Scotia)
Silicon Valley (San Jose, CA)
Tiffin (Tiffin, OH)
VA Lynchburg (Lynchburg, VA)

Red Dragons

SUNY Cortland (Cortland, NY)
SUNY Oneonta (Oneonta, NY)

Giants

Keystone (La Plume, PA)
Sequoias (Visalia, CA)
Wabash (Crawfordsville, IN) - Little Giants

Griffins

Canisius (Buffalo, NY) - Golden Griffins
Chestnut Hill (Philadelphia)
Fontbonne (Clayton, MO)
Golden Gate (San Francisco)
Grossmont (El Cajon, CA)
Gwynedd Mercy (Gwynedd Valley, PA)
MacEwan (Edmonton, AB)
Marymount Manhattan (New York City)
Reed (Portland, OR)
Seton Hill (Greensburg, PA)
St. Clair (Windsor, ON)
Westminster (UT) (Salt Lake City)

Griffons

Missouri Western (Saint Joseph, MO)
l'Outaouais (Gatineau, QC)

Gryphons

Guelph (Guelph)
Sarah Lawrence (Yonkers, NY)

Phantoms

Delaware County CC (Delaware County, PA and Chester County, PA)
East-West (Chicago)

Phoenix

André-Grasset (Montreal) - Phenix
UChicago (Chicago)
Cumberland (Lebanon, TN)
Elon (Elon, NC)
FL Poly (Lakeland, FL)
Green Bay (Green Bay, WI)
Olin (Needham, MA)
Swarthmore (Swarthmore, PA)
Wilson (Chambersburg, PA)

Firebirds

Carthage (Kenosha, WI)
Kirtland CC (Grayling, MI)
Saint Katherine (San Marcos, CA)
UDC (Washington, D.C.)

Spirits

Salem (Winston-Salem)
UW–Baraboo/Sauk County (Baraboo, WI)

Spirit

DE Tech CC-Stanton/Wilmington (Newark, DE)
Ottawa (AZ) (Surprise, AZ)

Thunderbirds

Algoma (Sault Ste. Marie, ON)
British Columbia (Vancouver)
Casper (Casper, WY)
Cloud County CC (Concordia, KS)
Highline (Des Moines, WA)
Merritt (Oakland, CA)
Mesa CC (Mesa, AZ)
NM Junior (Hobbs, New Mexico)
Southern Utah (Cedar City, UT)
United Tribes Tech (Bismarck, ND)

Miscellaneous

André-Laurendeau (Montreal) - Boomerangs
Bethel (KS) (North Newton, KS) - Threshers
Bishop's (Sherbrooke) - Gaiters
Culinary Institute of America (Hyde Park, NY) - Steels
Presbyterian (Clinton, SC) - Blue Hose
RISD (Providence, RI) (ice hockey) - Nads
Saint Mary (KS) (Leavenworth, KS) - Spires
St. John's (NM) (Santa Fe, New Mexico) (no sports) - Libros
St. Louis CC (Ferguson, MO) - Fury
Tohono O'odham CC (Pima, AZ) - Jegos
UHSP (St. Louis) - Eutectics
Xavier (LA) (New Orleans) (women's teams only) - Gold Nuggets & Gold Rush

Beacons

Bushnell (Eugene, OR)
UMass Boston (Boston) 
Valparaiso (Valparaiso, IN)

Blazers

Belhaven (Jackson, MS)
Canadian Mennonite (Winnipeg)
Elms (Chicopee, MA)
Hood (Frederick, MD)
Kingswood (Sussex, NB)
North Lake (Irving, TX)
UAB (Birmingham, AL)
Valdosta State (Valdosta, GA)

Lasers

Lasell (Newton, MA)
Irvine Valley (Irvine, CA)
Onondaga CC (Syracuse, NY) - Lazers

Nickname based upon college name

Augsburg (Minneapolis) – Auggies
Cape Breton (Sydney, NS) – Capers
Gustavus Adolphus (St. Peter, MN) – Gusties
Immaculata (Chester County, PA) – Mighty Macs
Jamestown (Jamestown, ND) - Jimmies
Pacific Lutheran (Tacoma, WA) – Lutes
Saint Benedict (St. Joseph, MN) – Bennies
St. Bonaventure (St. Bonaventure, NY) – Bonnies
Saint John's (MN) (Collegeville, MN) - Johnnies
St. Olaf (Northfield, MN) – Oles
Webb (Glen Cove, NY) – Webbies
Tecnológico Autónomo México (Mexico City) - Itamitas
Western TX (Snyder, TX) – Westerners

Tommies

St. Thomas (MN) (Saint Paul, MN)
St. Thomas (NB) (Fredericton)

Nickname based upon college tradition/figure

Akron (Akron, OH) - Zips
Arkansas Tech (Russellville, AR) - Wonder Boys
Charlotte (Charlotte, NC) - 49ers
Georgetown (Washington, D.C.) - Hoyas
James Madison (Harrisonburg, VA) – Dukes
Manhattan (Riverdale, Bronx) - Jaspers
Saint Mary-of-the-Woods (Saint Mary-of-the-Woods, IN) - Pomeroys
Vanderbilt (Nashville, TN) – Commodores
Virginia Tech (Blacksburg, VA) - Hokies
Washburn (Topeka, KS) - Ichabods
Williams (Williamstown, MA) - Ephs
Winnipeg (Winnipeg) - Wesmen

Sabers/Sabres

Barber-Scotia (Concord, NC) - Mighty Sabres
Marian (WI) (Fond du Lac, WI)

Vehicles (larger category)

Chesapeake (Wye Mills, MD) - Skipjacks
Haverford (Ardmore, PA) - Fords

Clippers

Briercrest (Caronport, Saskatchewan)
Maine-Machias (Machias, ME)
South Puget Sound CC (Olympia, WA)
Express
Wells (Aurora, NY)
Owens CC (Toledo, OH)

Jets

Jackson (MI) (Jackson, MI)
Miramar (San Diego, CA)
Newman (KS) (Wichita, KS)
South GA Tech (Americus, GA)

Rockets

Southern AR Tech
Toledo (Toledo, OH)

Nature/outer space

Five Towns (Dix Hills, NY) - Sound
Fraser Valley (Abbotsford, BC) - Cascades
l'Abitibi-Témiscamingue (Rouyn-Noranda, QC) - Gaillards & Astrelles
Long Beach State (Long Beach, CA) - The Beach
MT State-Northern (Havre, MT) - Northern Lights
New England (ME) (Biddeford, ME) - Nor'easters
Rockies (Cranbrook, BC) - Avalanche
Slippery Rock (Slippery Rock, PA) - The Rock
SUNY Oswego (Oswego, NY) - Great Lakers

Comets

Coconino CC (Flagstaff, AZ)
Contra Costa (San Pablo, CA)
Cottey (Nevada, MO)
Mayville State (Mayville, ND)
Olivet (Olivet, MI)
Palomar (San Marcos, CA)
UT Dallas (Richardson, TX)

Electricity (larger category)

Cincinnati State Tech/CC (Cincinnati) - Surge
Washington Adventist (Takoma Park, MD) - Shock

Lightning

Lehman (The Bronx) - Lightning
St. Mary's (AB) (Calgary, AB)

Flames

Alverno (Milwaukee) – Inferno
Bethesda (Anaheim, CA)
Knox (IL) (Galesburg, IL) – Prairie Fire
Lee (TN) (Cleveland, TN)
Liberty (Lynchburg, VA)
Saint Mary (NE) (Omaha, NE)
Southeastern (FL) (Lakeland, FL) – Fire
Steinbach Bible (Steinbach, MB)
UBC Okanagan (Kelowna) – Heat
UIC (Chicago)
Welch (Gallatin, TN)

Hurricanes

GA SW State (Americus, GA)
Heritage (Gatineau, QC)
Holland (Charlottetown)
Lone Star-North Harris (Harris County, TX)
Louisburg (Louisburg, NC)
Miami (Coral Gables, FL)
Tulsa (Tulsa, OK) - Golden Hurricanes

Mounties
Note: "Mounties" can refer to either the geographic feature or, in Canada, the Royal Canadian Mounted Police. Mount Allison's nickname may possibly come from either source; U.S. schools would use the geographic feature.

Mansfield (Mansfield, PA)
Mount Allison (Sackville, NB)
Mount Aloysius (Cresson, PA)
Mt. San Antonio (Walnut, CA)

Plants (larger category)

Arkansas-Monticello (Monticello, AR) – Cotton Blossoms (women's teams only)
Chaminade (Honolulu) - Silverswords
Concordia (Moorhead) (Moorhead, MN) - Cobbers
Copper Mountain (Joshua Tree, CA) - Fighting Cacti
Delta State (Cleveland, MS) – Fighting Okra
IN State (Terre Haute, IN) – Sycamores
OH State (Columbus, OH) – Buckeyes
Simon Fraser (Burnaby, BC) – Red Leafs
Scottsdale CC (Scottsdale, AZ) – Fighting Artichokes
UNC School of the Arts (Winston-Salem) (no sports teams) – Fighting Pickles

Mighty Oaks

Goshen (Goshen, IN)
Oakland City (Oakland City, IN)
SUNY–ESF, (Syracuse, NY

Oaks

Menlo (Menlo Park, CA)
Salem CC (Carneys Point Township, NJ)

Stars

Dominican (IL) (River Forest, IL)
Illinois-Springfield (Springfield, IL) - Prairie Stars
Lansing CC (Lansing, MI)
Oklahoma City (Oklahoma City, OK)
South AR CC (El Dorado, AR)
Stephens (Columbia, MO)

Storm

AZ Christian (Phoenix, AZ) Firestorm
Chemeketa CC (Salem, OR)
Crown (St. Bonifacius, MN)
Davidson-Davie CC (Lexington, NC)
Eston (Eston, Saskatchewan)
Harrisburg Science/Tech (Harrisburg, PA)
Napa Valley (Napa, CA)
Nueta Hidatsa Sahnish (New Town, ND)
Simpson (IA) (Indianola, IA)
Southeast CC (multicampus)
SE OK State (Durant, OK) – Savage Storm
Southern Nazarene (Bethany, OK) – Crimson Storm
SW IL (Belleville, IL)
Tidewater CC (multicampus)

Red Storm

St. John's (NY) (Jamaica, Queens)
Rio Grande (Rio Grande, OH)

Suns

AR Tech (Russellville, AR) - Golden Suns
Cedar Valley (Lancaster, TX)
Sitting Bull (Fort Yates, ND)

Thunder

Algonquin (Ottawa, ON)
Concordia Edmonton (Edmonton, AB)
Fond du Lac Tribal/CC (Cloquet, MN)
Lake Erie (Painesville, OH)
Lakehead (Thunder Bay)
Manhattan Christian (Manhattan, KS)
Trine (Angola, IN)
Wheaton (IL) (Wheaton, IL)

Tornadoes

Brevard (Brevard, NC)
Concordia (TX) (Austin, TX)
Geneva (Beaver Falls, PA) – Golden Tornadoes
King (Bristol, TN) – Tornado
Talladega (Talladega, AL)

Cyclones

Centenary (NJ) (Hackettstown, NJ)
IA State (Ames, IA)
Moraine Valley CC (Palos Hills, IL)
St. Cloud Tech/CC (St. Cloud, MN)
UW–Fox Valley (Menasha, WI)

Wave/Waves

Alabama (Tuscaloosa, AL) – Crimson Tide
Calumet St. Joseph (Whiting, IN) - Crimson Wave
FL State-Jacksonville (Jacksonville, FL) – BlueWaves
Galveston (Galveston, TX) - Whitecaps
Kingsborough CC (Brooklyn) – Wave
OH State–Marion (Marion, OH) – Scarlet Wave
Pepperdine (Malibu, CA) – Waves
Tulane (New Orleans) – Green Wave

People

Arkansas CC-Batesville (Batesville, AR) - River Bandits
ASA (New York City) - Avengers
Blue Mountain (Blue Mountain, MS) - Toppers
Centenary LA (Shreveport, LA) - Gentlemen & Ladies
Clatsop CC (Astoria, OR) - Bandits
Columbia (CA) (Columbia, CA) - Claim Jumpers
Columbia-Greene CC (Hudson, NY) - Twins
Drummondville (Drummondville, QC) - Voltigeurs
IA Western CC (Council Bluffs, IA) - Reivers
LA Tech (Ruston, LA) (women's teams only) - Lady Techsters
LeMoyne-Owen (Memphis, TN) - Magicians
Loyola Chicago (Chicago) - Ramblers
NW OH (Lima, OH) - Racers
Oberlin (Oberlin, OH) - Yeomen
Ohio University-Zanesville (Zanesville, OH) - Tracers
Pacific (OR) (Forest Grove, OR) - Boxers
Pitt CC (Winterville, NC) - Bruisers
UQAM (Montreal) - Citadins
St. Francis Xavier (Antigonish, NS) - X-Men and X-Women
Sussex County CC (Newton, NJ) - Skylanders

Academic occupations (larger category)

Brandeis (Waltham, MA) - Judges
Rowan (Glassboro, NJ) – Profs
Southern NH (Manchester, NH) - Penmen
Whittier (Whittier, CA) – Poets

Agricultural occupations (larger category)

OK Science/Arts (Chickasha, OK) - Drovers
Wichita State (Wichita, KS) - Shockers

Aggies

Cameron (Lawton, OK)
Delaware Valley (Doylestown, PA)
Doña Ana CC (Las Cruces, NM)
NE Tech Agriculture (Curtis, NE)
New Mexico State (Las Cruces, NM)
North Carolina A&T (Greensboro, NC)
OK Panhandle State (Goodwell, OK)
Texas A&M (College Station, TX)
Texas A&M-Galveston (Galveston, TX) – Sea Aggies
UC Davis (Davis, CA)
Utah State (Logan, UT)

Wranglers

Cisco (Cisco, TX)
Flint Hills Tech (Emporia, KS) 
Odessa (Odessa, TX)

Belles

Bennett (Greensboro, NC)
St. Mary's (IN) (Notre Dame, IN)

Cowboys (larger category)

Connors State (Warner, OK)
Garden City CC (Garden City, KS) – Broncbusters
Hardin-Simmons (Abilene, TX)
McNeese (Lake Charles, LA)
NM Highlands (Las Vegas, New Mexico)
OK State-Stillwater (Stillwater, OK)
Puerto Rico-Bayamón (Bayamón, Puerto Rico)
Southern AR (Magnolia, AR) – Muleriders
SW TX Junior (Uvalde, TX)
Wyoming (Laramie, WY)

Gauchos

UC Santa Barbara (Santa Barbara, CA)
Glendale CC (AZ) (Glendale, AZ)
Saddleback (Mission Viejo, CA)

Rough Riders/Roughriders

Crowder (Neosho, MO)
Luna CC (Las Vegas, NM)
Yavapai (Prescott, AZ)

Rustlers

Central WY (Riverton, WY)
Golden West (Huntington Beach, CA)
Lakeland (AB) (Lloydminster, AB)

Vaqueros

Central AZ (Coolidge, AZ)
Santa Barbara City (Santa Barbara, CA)
UTRGV (Rio Grande Valley, Texas)
Glendale CC (CA) (Glendale, CA)

Engineers

MIT (Cambridge, MA)
Rensselaer Poly (Troy, NY)
Rose-Hulman (Terre Haute, IN) – Fightin' Engineers
Worcester Poly (Worcester, MA)

Exploration (larger category)

Goodwin (East Hartford, CT) - Navigators
La Salle (Philadelphia) - Explorers

Conquistadors

Dodge City CC (Dodge City, KS)
Pasco-Hernando CC (New Port Richey, FL)
FL National (Hialeah, FL)

Voyageurs

Laurentian (Greater Sudbury)
Rainy River CC (International Falls, MN)

Foresters

Huntington (Huntington, IN)
Lake Forest (Lake Forest, IL)

Hilltoppers

St. Edward's (Austin, TX)
West Liberty (West Liberty, WV)
Western Kentucky (Bowling Green)

Knights (standalone category - large quantity)

Academy of Art (San Francisco) - Urban Knights
Aiken Tech (Graniteville, SC)
Arcadia (Glenside, PA)
Bellarmine (Louisville, KY)
Berkeley (New York City)
Calvin (Grand Rapids)
Carleton (MN) (Northfield, MN)
CC Baltimore County-Essex (Essex, MD)
Central Penn (Summerdale, PA)
Columbia Southern (Orange Beach, AL)
CC RI (multicampus)
Crossroads (Rochester, MN)
Danville CC (Danville, VA)
Fairleigh Dickinson (Teaneck, NJ)
Halifax CC (Weldon, NC)
KY Christian (Grayson, KY)
LA Delta CC (Monroe, LA)
Lanier Tech (Gainesville, GA)
Lynn (Boca Raton, FL) - Fighting Knights
Marian (IN) (Indianapolis)
Martin Luther (New Ulm, MN)
Middle GA State (Macon, GA)
Mount Saint Mary (Newburgh, NY)
Neumann (Aston, PA)
New Jersey City (Jersey City, NJ) - Gothic Knights
Niagara (ON) (multicampus)
North Platte CC (part of Mid-Plains Community College) (North Platte, NE)
Northern Essex CC (Haverhill, MA & Lawrence, MA)
Northwood (Cedar Hill, TX)
Queens (Queens)
Rutgers (New Brunswick, NJ) - Scarlet Knights
San Diego City (San Diego, CA)
Shasta (Redding, CA)
Southern-New Orleans (New Orleans)
Southern VA (Buena Vista, VA)
SW Adventist (Keene, TX)
St. Andrews (Laurinburg, NC)
Stanislas (Quebec City)
Surry CC (Dobson, NC)
UCF (Orlando, FL)
U.S. Military Academy [Army] (West Point, NY) - Black Knights
Warner Pacific (Portland, OR)
Wenatchee Valley (Wenatchee, WA)
Wartburg (Waverly, IA)

Blue Knights

Dakota County Tech (Rosemount, MN)
Olney Central (Olney, IL)
SUNY Geneseo (Geneseo, NY)

Golden Knights

Clarkson (Potsdam, NY)
Gannon (Erie, PA)
Saint Rose (Albany, NY)
West GA Tech (Waco, GA)

Green Knights

St. Norbert (De Pere, WI)
VT Tech (Randolph Center, Vermont)

Purple Knights

Bridgeport (Bridgeport, CT)
Saint Michael's (Colchester, VT)

Marauders

Antelope Valley College (Lancaster, CA)
Central State (Wilberforce, OH)
Macaulay (Manhattan)
McMaster (Hamilton, ON)
Millersville (Millersville, PA)
Mary (Bismarck, ND)
UW–Marshfield/Wood County (Marshfield, WI)

Maritime (larger category)

Cal State Maritime (Vallejo, CA) – Keelhaulers
Christopher Newport (Newport News, VA) – Captains
Erskine (Due West, SC) – Flying Fleet
RI College (Providence, RI) – Anchormen
Rollins (Winter Park, FL) – Tars
St. Clair County CC (Port Huron, Michigan) – Skippers
The Apprentice School (Newport News, VA) - Builders
U.S. Naval Academy (Annapolis, MD) – Midshipmen
Washington (MD) (Chestertown, MD) – Shoremen

Buccaneers

Atlantic Cape CC (multicampus)
Barry (Miami Shores, FL)
Beloit (Beloit, WI)
Blinn (Brenham, TX)
Charleston Southern (Charleston, SC)
Christian Brothers (Memphis, TN)
Dawson CC (Glendive, MT)
East TN State (Johnson City, TN)
FL SW State (multicampus)
MA Bay CC (multicampus)
MA Maritime (Buzzards Bay, MA)
Park Gilbert (Gilbert, AZ)
Shelton State CC (Tuscaloosa, AL)
Virgin Islands (St. Croix & St. Thomas, Virgin Islands)
UW–Marinette (Marinette, WI)

Commodores

Capital CC (Hartford, CT)
Gulf Coast State (Panama City, FL)
Lorain County CC (Elyria, OH)

Corsairs

Asnuntuck CC (Enfield, CT)
Redwoods (Eureka, CA)
Santa Monica (Santa Monica, CA)
UMass–Dartmouth (Dartmouth, MA)

Lakers

Clayton State (Morrow, GA)
Finger Lakes CC (Canandaigua, NY)
Garrett (McHenry, MD)
Grand Valley State (Allendale, MI)
IA Lakes CC (Estherville, IA)
Lake Land (Mattoon, IL)
Lakeland CC (Kirtland, OH)
Lake Superior State (Sault Ste. Marie, MI)
Mercyhurst (Erie, PA)
Mid MI CC (Harrison, MI & Mount Pleasant, MI)
Nipissing (North Bay, ON)
Roosevelt (Chicago)
SW OR CC (Coos Bay, OR)
SUNY Oswego (Oswego, NY)

Mariners

Coastal GA (Brunswick, GA)
Marin (Kentfield, CA & Novato, CA)
Maine Maritime (Castine, ME)
Merchant Marine (Kings Point, NY)
Mitchell (New London, CT)
Vancouver Island (Nanaimo, BC)

Pirates

Chattahoochee Valley CC (Phenix City, AL)
East Carolina (Greenville, NC)
GA State-Armstrong (Savannah, GA)
Hampton (Hampton, VA)
Independence CC (Independence, KS)
Modesto Junior (Modesto, CA)
North Central MO (Trenton, MO)
Orange Coast (Costa Mesa, CA)
Palo Verde (Blythe, CA)
Park (MO) (Parkville, MO)
Peninsula (Port Angeles, WA)
Pensacola State (Pensacola, FL)
Porterville (Porterville, CA)
Seton Hall (South Orange, NJ)
Southwestern (TX) (Georgetown, TX)
Ventura (Ventura, CA)
Whitworth (Spokane, WA)

Privateers

New Orleans (New Orleans)
SUNY Maritime (Throggs Neck)

Matadors

 AZ Western (Yuma, AZ)
Cal State Northridge (Northridge, CA)
San Diego (San Diego, CA) - Toreros
Valencia (Orlando, FL)

Military (larger category)

Alderson Broaddus (Philippi, WV) – Battlers
Ave Maria (Ave Maria, FL) – Gyrenes
Gettysburg (Gettysburg, PA) - Bullets
Hamilton (NY) (Clinton, NY) - Continentals
Ithaca (Ithaca, NY) - Bombers
IU Southeast (New Albany, IN) – Grenadiers
Manhattanville (Purchase, NY) – Valiants
Millsaps (Jackson, MS) - Majors
Montréal (Montreal) – Carabins
UMass (Amherst, MA) – Minutemen and Minutewomen
Ursuline (Pepper Pike, OH) - Arrows
VMI (Lexington, VA) – Keydets
Xavier (OH) (Cincinnati) – Musketeers
Western Illinois (Macomb) - Leathernecks

Archers

Moody Bible (Chicago)
St. Louis CC (Kirkwood, MO)

Cadets

Norwich (Northfield, VT)
Valley Forge Military (Wayne, PA)

Cannoneers

Jefferson CC (NY) (Watertown, NY) 
Pratt (Brooklyn)

Cavaliers

Aquinas (TN) (Nashville)
Bois-de-Boulogne (Montreal)
Bossier Parish CC (Bossier City, LA)
Cabrini (Radnor, PA)
Kankakee CC (Kankakee, IL)
Johnson County CC (Overland Park, KS)
Montreat (Montreat, NC)
Virginia (Charlottesville, VA)
UVA Wise (Wise, VA)
Walsh (Canton, OH)
Western Tech (La Crosse, WI)

Chargers

Alabama–Huntsville (Huntsville, AL)
Briar Cliff (Sioux City, IA)
Camosun (Saanich, BC)
Capitol (Laurel, MD)
Carl Sandburg (Galesburg, IL)
Colby-Sawyer (New London, NH)
Columbia State CC (Columbia, TN)
Crandall (Moncton)
Cypress (Cypress, CA)
Dominican (NY) (Orangeburg, NY)
Edison State CC (Piqua, OH)
GA Highlands (multicampus)
Hillsdale (Hillsdale, MI)
Lancaster Bible (Lancaster, PA)
New Haven (West Haven, CT)
Point (Atlanta)
SE Baptist (Laurel, MS)
UW–Barron County (Rice Lake, WI)

Colonels

Centre (Danville, KY)
Curry (Milton, MA)
Eastern Kentucky (Richmond, KY)
Nicholls (Thibodaux, LA)
Wilkes (Wilkes-Barre, PA)

Colonials

George Washington (Washington, D.C.)
Robert Morris (Moon Township, PA)
Southampton (Southampton, NY)
Western CT State (Danbury, CT)

Conquerors

Carolina (Winston-Salem) 
Free Lutheran (Plymouth, MN)

Defenders

Clarks Summit (Clarks Summit, PA)
Dordt (Sioux Center, IA)

Generals

LSU–Alexandria (Alexandria, LA)
Sheridan (WY) (Sheridan, WY)
SUNY Herkimer (Herkimer, NY)
SUNY Sullivan (Loch Sheldrake, NY)
Washington & Lee (Lexington, VA)

Lancers

CA Baptist (Riverside, CA)
Eastern WY (Torrington, WY)
Grace (Winona Lake, IN)
Lake County (Grayslake, IL)
Lenoir CC (Kinston, NC)
Longwood (Farmville, VA)
Loyalist (Belleville, ON)
Mount Marty (Yankton, SD)
South Carolina-Lancaster (Lancaster, SC)
Windsor (Windsor, ON)
Worcester State (Worcester, MA)
Pasadena City (Pasadena, CA)

Paladins

Furman (Greenville, SC)
Royal Military Canada (Kingston, ON)

Sentinels

North FL CC (Madison, FL) 
Patrick Henry (Purcellville, VA)

Vanguards

AR State-Beebe (Beebe, AR)
Vance-Granville CC (Henderson, NC)

Miners (larger category)

Findlay (Findlay, OH) - Oilers
New Mexico Mines (Socorro)
Missouri S&T (Rolla, MO)
South Dakota Mines (Rapid City, SD) - Hardrockers
UTEP (El Paso, TX)
Yuba (Marysville, CA) - 49ers
Orediggers
Colorado Mines (Golden, CO)
Montana Tech (Butte, MT)

Mountaineers

Appalachian State (Boone, NC)
Berea (Berea, KY)
Eastern OK State (Wilburton, OK)
Eastern Oregon (La Grande, OR)
Mansfield (Mansfield, PA)
Mohawk (Hamilton, ON)
Mount St. Mary's (MD) (Emmitsburg, MD)
Schreiner (Kerrville, TX)
West Virginia (Morgantown, WV)
Western Colorado (Gunnison, CO)

Mystics

Bismarck State (Bismarck, ND)
Mount Saint Vincent (NS) (Halifax, NS)

Nickname based upon Indigenous peoples

Central MI (Mount Pleasant, MI) – Chippewas
FL State (Tallahassee, FL) – Seminoles
Haskell Indian Nations (Lawrence, KS) - Fighting Indians
Illinois (Champaign, IL) – Fighting Illini (Illinois Confederation)
Mississippi College (Clinton, MS) – Choctaws
Oglala Lakota (Kyle, SD) - Bravehearts
Mendez (Gurabo, Puerto Rico) - Tainos
Southwestern (KS) (Winfield, KS) – Moundbuilders
Utah (Salt Lake City) – Utes
Turtle Mountain CC (Belcourt, ND) - Mighty Mickinocks
Williston State (Williston, ND) – Tetons
William & Mary (Williamsburg, VA) - Tribe

Apaches

Cochise (Douglas, AZ)
Tyler Junior (Tyler, TX)

Aztecs

Américas Puebla (San Andrés Cholula)
Pima CC (Tucson, AZ)
San Diego State (San Diego, CA)

Braves

Alcorn State (Lorman, MS)
Black Hawk (Kewanee, IL & Moline, IL))
Bradley (Peoria, IL)
Chowan (Murfreesboro, NC)
Goldey-Beacom (Wilmington, DE)
Husson (Bangor, ME)
Ottawa (AZ/KS) (multicampus)
UNC Pembroke (Pembroke, NC)

Chiefs

American Samoa CC (Mapusaga, American Samoa)
Faulkner State CC (Gulf Shores, AL) - Sun Chiefs
Waubonsee CC (Sugar Grove, IL)

Indians

Catawba (Salisbury, NC)
Chipola (Marianna, FL)
Ciudad Juárez (Ciudad Juárez)
Itawamba CC (Fulton, MS)
McCook CC (part of Mid-Plains Community College) (McCook, NE)
South Carolina-Salkehatchie (Allendale, SC)

Nickname based on cultures/peoples (not Indigenous American)

Alma (Alma, QC) - Jeannois
Atlantis (Miami) - Atlanteans
BYU-Hawaii (Laie, HI) (no athletics) - Seasiders
Compton (Compton, CA) – Tartars
El Paso CC (El Paso, TX) - Tejanos & Tejanas
Idaho (Moscow, ID) – Vandals
Louisiana (Lafayette, LA) - Ragin' Cajuns
Montmorency (Laval, QC) - Nomades
Mount St. Mary's (CA) (Los Angeles) – Athenians
New England (NH) (Henniker, NH) - Pilgrims

Dutch/Dutchmen

Central (IA) (Pella, IA) – Dutch
Hope (Holland, MI) – Flying Dutchmen
Lebanon Valley (Annville, PA) – Flying Dutchmen
Union (NY) (Schenectady, NY) – Dutchmen

Fighting Scots

Edinboro (Edinboro, PA)
Gordon (MA) (Wenham, MA)
McHenry County (Crystal Lake, IL)
Monmouth (IL) (Monmouth, IL)
Wooster (Wooster, OH)

Gaels

Iona (New Rochelle, NY)
Queen's (Kingston, ON) – Golden Gaels
Saint Mary's (CA) (Moraga, CA)

Highlanders

Cairn  (Langhorne, PA)
Gordon State (Barnesville, GA)
Houghton (Houghton, NY)
McLennan CC (Waco, TX)
NJIT (Newark, NJ)
Radford (Radford, VA)
UC Riverside (Riverside, CA)

Islanders

John Abbott (Sainte-Anne-de-Bellevue, QC)
TX A&M-Corpus Christi (Corpus Christi, TX)

Norse

Bay de Noc CC (Escanaba, MI)
Lionel-Groulx (Sainte-Thérèse, QC) - Nordiques
Luther (Decorah, IA)
Mesabi Range (Virginia, MN & Eveleth, MN
North Hennepin CC (Brooklyn Park, MN) - Norsemen
Northern Kentucky (Highland Heights)
NE OK A&M (Miami, OK)

Quakers

Earlham (Richmond, IN)
Guilford (Greensboro, NC)
Penn (Philadelphia)
Wilmington (OH) (Wilmington, OH)

U.S. state nicknames

Central Piedmont CC (Charlotte, NC) - Meck Dec'ers
Iowa (Iowa City, IA) - Hawkeyes
Indiana (Bloomington, IN) – Hoosiers
Nebraska (Lincoln, NE) - Cornhuskers
North Carolina (Chapel Hill, NC) - Tar Heels
Oklahoma (Norman, OK) - Sooners

Scots

Alma (Alma, MI)
Covenant (Lookout Mountain, GA)
Lyon (Batesville, AR) (men's teams only)
Macalester (Saint Paul, MN)
Maryville (TN) (Maryville, TN)
Presbyterian (Clinton, SC)

Texans

South Plains (Levelland, TX)
Tarleton (Stephenville, TX)

Volunteers

Logan (IL) (Carterville, IL)
Tennessee (Knoxville, TN)

Western European groups

Albion (Albion, MI) – Britons
Alfred (Alfred, NY) – Saxons
Bethany (KS) (Lindsborg, KS) – Terrible Swedes
Carlow (Pittsburgh) – Celtics
Notre Dame (South Bend, IN) – Fighting Irish
St. Thomas (TX) (Houston) – Celts

Vikings

Augustana (IL) (Rock Island, IL)
Augustana (SD) (Sioux Falls, SD)
Barstow CC (Barstow, CA)
Bethany Lutheran (Mankato, MN)
Berry (Mount Berry, GA)
Big Bend CC (Moses Lake, WA)
BYU–Idaho (Rexburg)
Carl Albert State (Poteau, OK)
Cleveland State (Cleveland)
Del Mar (Corpus Christi, TX)
Diablo Valley (Pleasant Hill, CA)
Elizabeth City State (Elizabeth City, NC)
Glen Oaks CC (Centreville, MI)
Grand View (Des Moines)
Grayson (Denison, TX)
Hudson Valley CC (Troy, NY)
Itasca CC (Grand Rapids, MN)
Jefferson (MO) (Hillsboro, MO)
Lawrence (Appleton, WI)
Long Beach City (Long Beach, CA)
Maisonneuve (Montreal)
Mercer County CC (Trenton, NJ & West Windsor, NJ)
MO Valley (Marshall, MO)
North Park (Chicago)
Northwest-Shoals CC (Phil Campbell, AL)
Ocean County (Toms River, NJ)
Portland State (Portland, OR)
Salem State (Salem, MA)
Sampson CC (Clinton, NC)
St. Johns River State (Palatka, FL)
St. Lawrence (Kingston, ON)
UAlberta Augustana (Camrose, Alberta)
Valley City State (Valley City, ND)
Victoria (Victoria, BC) – Vikes
Villa Maria (Buffalo, NY)
Westchester CC (Valhalla, NY)
West Valley (Saratoga, CA)
Western WA (Bellingham, WA)

Pacers

Marywood (Scranton, PA)
Piedmont CC (Roxboro, NC)
USC Aiken (Aiken, SC)
William Peace (Raleigh, NC)

Pilots

AR State-Newport (Newport, AR) - Aviators
Bethel (IN) (Mishawaka, IN)
LSU-Shreveport (Shreveport, LA)
Portland (Portland, OR)
Providence Seminary (Otterburne, MB)
Prairie (Three Hills, AB)

Flyers

Dayton (Dayton, OH)
Lewis (Romeoville, IL)
Sandhills CC (Pinehurst, NC)

Pioneers

Alfred State (Alfred, NY)
Antelope Valley (Lancaster, CA)
Butler County CC (Butler, PA)
Cal State East Bay (Hayward, CA)
Carroll (WI) (Waukesha, WI)
Crowley's Ridge (Paragould, AR)
Delta (MI) (University Center, MI)
Denver (Denver)
Glenville State (Glenville, WV)
Grinnell (Grinnell, IA)
Indian River State (Fort Pierce, FL)
Lewis & Clark (Portland, OR)
Malone (Canton, OH)
Marietta (Marietta, OH)
MidAmerica Nazarene (Olathe, KS)
Miles CC (Miles City, MT)
North AR (Harrison, AR)
Northland CC/Tech (Thief River Falls, MN & East Grand Forks, MN)
Pacific Union (Angwin, CA)
Point Park (Pittsburgh)
Pontifical Catholic-Mayagüez (Mayagüez, Puerto Rico)
Prairie State (Chicago Heights, IL)
Sacred Heart (Fairfield, CT)
Smith (Northampton, MA)
Spartanburg Methodist (Spartanburg, SC)
Texas Woman's (Denton, TX)
Transylvania (Lexington, KY)
Tusculum (Greeneville, TN)
Utica (Utica, NY)
Volunteer State CC (Gallatin, TN)
Wayland Baptist (Plainview, TX)
Western OK State (Altus, OK)
Western Piedmont CC (Morganton, NC)
Wharton County Junior (Wharton, TX)
William Paterson (Wayne, NJ)
UW-Platteville (Platteville, WI)

Plainsmen

Frank Phillips (Borger, TX)
Northeastern Junior (Sterling, CO)

Pipers

Hamline (Saint Paul, MN)
Lyon (Batesville, AR) (women's teams only)

Political movements (larger category)

Antioch (Yellow Springs, OH) – Radicals
Providence Christian (Pasadena, CA) - Sea Beggars
Yeshiva (New York City) - Maccabees & Lady Macs

Patriots

Arlington Baptist (Arlington, TX)
Baptist Bible (MO) (Springfield, MO)
College of Central FL (Ocala, FL)
Cumberlands (Williamsburg, KY)
Dallas Baptist (Dallas)
Francis Marion (Florence, SC)
George Mason (Fairfax, VA)
Isothermal CC (Spindale, NC)
Northwest-Shoals CC (Muscle Shoals, AL)
Patrick & Henry CC (Martinsville, VA)
South Piedmont CC (multicampus)
Southeastern Tech (Vidalia, GA)
Southern State CC (Hillsboro, OH)
UT Tyler (Tyler, TX)
Valley Forge (Phoenixville, PA)
Wallace Selma CC (Selma, AL)

Patriotes

Québec-Trois-Rivières (Trois-Rivières)
Saint-Laurent (Montreal)

Rebels

Hill (Hillsboro, TX)
Lee (TX) (Baytown, TX)
Mississippi [Ole Miss] (Oxford, MS)
Red River Poly (Winnipeg)
Sorel-Tracy (Sorel-Tracy, QC) - Rebelles
UNLV (Paradise, Nevada)

Renegades

Bakersfield (Bakersfield, CA)
Columbia Chicago (Chicago)
Ohlone (Fremont, CA & Newark, CA)

Political/royal occupations (larger category)

Cal Lutheran (Thousand Oaks, CA) - Kingsmen and Regals
Durham (Oshawa, ON) - Lords
Franklin & Marshall (Lancaster, PA) – Diplomats
Heidelberg (Tiffin, OH) - Student Princes
Monroe CC (Rochester, NY) - Tribunes
Rockford (Rockford, IL) - Regents
Washington & Jefferson (Washington, PA) – Presidents

Ambassadors

Oakwood (Huntsville, AL)
Ozark Christian (Joplin, MO)

Barons

Brewton–Parker (Mount Vernon, GA)
Corning CC (Corning, NY) - Red Barons
Franciscan (Steubenville, OH)
OH State–Lima (Lima, OH)
Rhodes State (Lima, OH)
Rowan-Burlington County (Mount Laurel, NJ)
Séminaire (Sherbrooke, QC)

Dons

San Francisco (San Francisco) 
Santa Ana (Santa Ana, CA)

Dukes

Duquesne (Pittsburgh)
Rowan-Cumberland (Vineland, NJ)

Governors

Austin Peay (Clarksville, TN)
Wallace CC (Dothan, AL)

Monarchs

King's (PA) (Wilkes-Barre, PA)
L.A. Valley (Valley Glen, Los Angeles, California)
Macomb CC (Warren, MI)
Methodist (Fayetteville, NC)
Old Dominion (Norfolk, VA)

Royals

Bethel (MN) (Arden Hills, MN)
Douglas (New Westminster, BC)
Eastern Mennonite (Harrisonburg, VA)
Ecclesia (Springdale, AR)
Hope International (Fullerton, CA)
Johnson (FL) (Kissimmee, FL)
Lake Region State (Devils Lake, ND)
Nipawin Bible (Nipawin, SK)
Queens Charlotte (Charlotte, NC)
Redeemer (Hamilton, ON)
Regent (Virginia Beach, VA)
Scranton (Scranton, PA)
Warner (Lake Wales, FL)

Senators

Davis & Elkins (Elkins, WV)
SUNY Ulster (Stone Ridge, NY)
Walters State CC (Morristown, TN)

Statesmen

Delta State (Cleveland, MS)
Hobart (Geneva, NY)
Kennedy-King (Chicago)
Lincoln Trail (Robinson, IL)
William Penn (Oskaloosa, IA)

Raiders

Central CC (multicampus)
Central Lakes (Brainerd, MN)
Colgate (Hamilton, NY)
Franklin (OH) (Columbus, OH)
Fulton-Montgomery CC (Johnstown, NY)
Grand Rapids CC (Grand Rapids
Milwaukee Engineering (Milwaukee)
Moorpark (Moorpark, CA)
Mount Union (Alliance, OH) - Purple Raiders
NW FL State (Niceville, FL)
Oakland CC (Oakland County, MI)
Oakton CC (Des Plaines, IL)
Pierce (Lakewood, WA & Puyallup, WA)
Rivier (Nashua, NH)
Roane State CC (Harriman, TN)
Rose State (Midwest City, OK)
Rutgers–Newark (Newark, NJ) - Scarlet Raiders
Seminole State (Sanford, FL)
Shippensburg (Shippensburg, PA)
Southern OR (Ashland, OR)
Three Rivers CC (MO) (Poplar Bluff, MO)
Wright State (Dayton, OH)

Blue Raiders

Lindsey Wilson (Columbia, KY)
Middle Tennessee (Murfreesboro, TN)

Red Raiders

Northwestern (IA) (Orange City, IA
Texas Tech (Lubbock, TX) - Red Raiders and Lady Raiders

Rangers

Drew (Madison, NJ)
Kilgore (Kilgore, TX)
NW MS CC (Senatobia, MS)
NW OK State (Alva, OK)
Olympic (Bremerton, WA)
Parkside (Somers, WI)
Regis (CO) (Denver)
Ranger (Ranger, TX)

Tartans

Carnegie Mellon (Pittsburgh)
Sinclair CC (Dayton, OH) - Tartan Pride

Trailblazers

AR State-Mountain Home (Mountain Home, AR)
Asheville-Buncombe Tech CC (Asheville, NC)
Atlanta Metropolitan (Atlanta)
Brightpoint CC (Chester, VA)
Centralia (Centralia, WA)
Forsyth Tech CC (Winston-Salem)
John Wood CC (Quincy, IL)
Lewis & Clark CC (Godfrey, IL)
Louisville Bible (Louisville, KY)
Luzerne County CC (Nanticoke, PA)
MA Liberal Arts (North Adams, MA)
North Central KS Tech (Beloit, KS)
North TX-Dallas (Dallas, TX)
OH Christian (Circleville, OH)
Utah Tech (St. George, UT)
Vincennes (Vincennes, IN)

Trades (larger category)

Acadia (Wolfville, NS) - Axemen and Axewomen
Grays Harbor (Aberdeen, WA) - Chokers
Lincoln Memorial (Harrogate, TN) - Railsplitters
Northwest (WY) (Powell, WY) - Trappers
Purdue (West Lafayette, IN) - Boilermakers
Stetson (DeLand, FL) - Hatters
Vermilion CC (Ely, MN) - Ironmen
Williamson Mechanical Trades (Media, PA) - Mechanics

Brewers

Vassar (Poughkeepsie, NY)
Williamsburg Tech (Kingstree, SC)

Loggers

Lincoln Land CC (Springfield, IL)
Puget Sound (Tacoma, WA)

Lumberjacks

Alpena CC (Alpena, MI)
Dakota Bottineau (Bottineau, ND) - Lumberjacks and Ladyjacks
Humboldt State (Arcata, CA)
Northern AZ (Flagstaff, AZ)
Northland (WI) (Ashland, WI) - LumberJacks and LumberJills
Stephen F. Austin (Nacogdoches, TX) - Lumberjacks and Ladyjacks

Warriors

Alliance (Manhattan, NY)
Appalachian Bible (Mount Hope, WV)
American Indian (Phoenix, AZ)
Bacone (Muskogee, OK)
Cal State Stanislaus (Turlock, CA)
Corban (Salem, OR)
Diné (Tsaile, AZ)
East Central CC (Decatur, MS)
Eastern CT State (Willimantic, CT)
East Stroudsburg (East Stroudsburg, PA)
El Camino (Alondra Park, CA)
Hawaii (Honolulu) - Rainbow Warrors & Rainbow Wahine
Hendrix (Conway, AR)
Indian Hills CC (Ottumwa, IA & Centerville, IA)
Indiana Tech (Fort Wayne, IN)
Jessup (Rocklin, CA)
Lewis-Clark State (Lewiston, ID)
Life Pacific (San Dimas, CA)
Little Priest (Winnebago, NE)
Lycoming (Williamsport, PA)
Massasoit CC (Brockton, MA)
Merrimack (North Andover, MA)
Midland (NE) (Fremont, NE)
Rend Lake (Ina, IL)
Ridgewater (Willmar, MN & Hutchinson, MN)
Rochester (MI) (Rochester Hills, MI)
Rowan-Cabarrus CC (multicampus)
Southern Wesleyan (Central, SC)
Sterling (KS) (Sterling, KS)
TX A&M-Central TX (Killeen, TX)
Union (NE) (Lincoln, NE)
Vaughn (Flushing, Queens)
Valor Christian Columbus, OH)
Wabash Valley (Mt. Carmel, IL)
Waterloo (Waterloo, ON)
Waldorf (Forest City, IA)
Walla Walla CC (Walla Walla, WA)
Wayne State (MI) (Detroit)
Webber International (Babson Park, FL)
Westcliff (Irvine, CA)
Westmont (Montecito, CA)
Winona State (Winona, MN)
WI Lutheran (Milwaukee)

See also
List of college team nicknames in the United States
List of college nickname changes in the United States
List of college mascots in the United States
Native American mascot controversy
Religious symbolism in U.S. sports team names and mascots

Footnotes

References

Nicknames
List
United S
College